= Al-Iman Mosque =

Al-Iman Mosque may refer to two mosques in different countries:

- Al-Iman Mosque (Singapore)
- Al-Iman Mosque (Syria)
