= Masjid Al-Islah =

Mosque located in Punggol, Singapore

- Jawi: مسجد الإصلاح
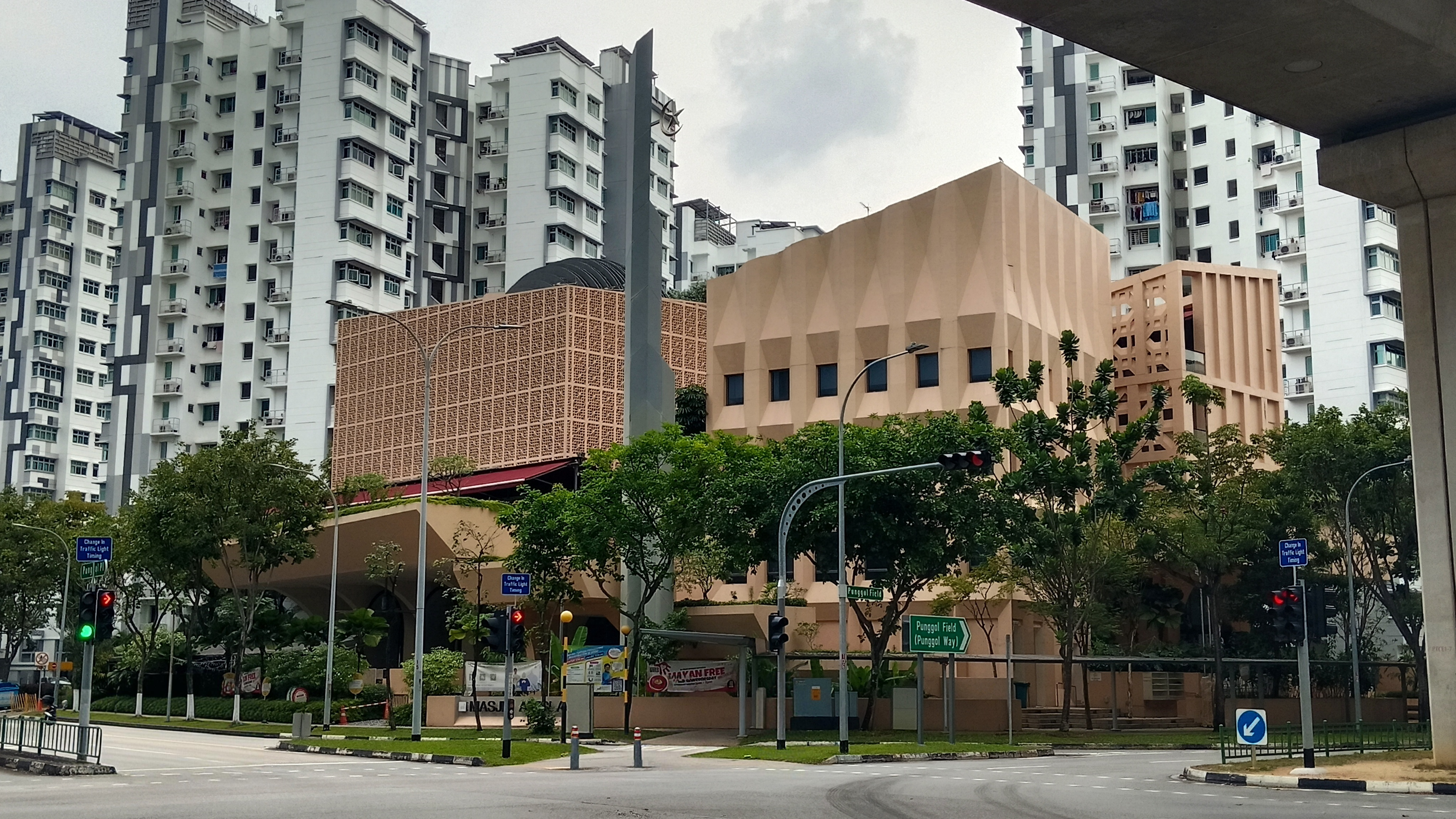
- Masjid Al-Islah in 2025

- Location in Singapore

Religion
- Affiliation: Sunni Islam

Location
- Location: 30 Punggol Fld, Singapore 828812
- Country: Singapore
- Coordinates: 1.4013989°N 103.9015299°E

Architecture
- Architect: Formwerkz Architects
- Completed: 2015
- Capacity: 4,000

Masjid Al-Islah (Jawi: مسجد الإصلاح; Al-Islah Mosque) is a mosque located in Punggol within the North-East Region, Singapore. Built in 2015, it is the only mosque situated in the Punggol neighbourhood.

== Etymology ==
The mosque's name, "Al-Islah" is an Arabic word which usually means "to reform" although it can also be translated as anything relating to improvement and transformation into something better. The name of the mosque was chosen by the Majlis Ugama Islam Singapura as it was decided the mosque would be holding programs for religious reform and community activities. Aside from that, Islah is also considered as an important term in the Islamic religion.

== History ==
Plans for a mosque to be built in Punggol had been made as early as the year 2013. The plans were eventually finalized and the proposed mosque was named Masjid Al-Islah. Construction on the mosque was completed by 6 June 2015. The mosque was the first mosque to be built in Punggol, since 2001 when Masjid Wak Sumang, an earlier and smaller mosque, was demolished along with the Kampung Wak Sumang village that stood along the shores of Punggol in 1995. The construction of a new mosque made it an easy destination for worshippers living in the Punggol area, whom would no longer need to travel to Masjid Al-Mawaddah or Masjid Al-Istiqamah to complete their Tarawih prayers.

In 2016, the Prime Minister of Singapore, Lee Hsien Loong, visited the mosque during the Islamic month of Ramadan and broke his fast alongside the other worshippers.

== Architecture ==
Masjid Al-Islah is built in a modern, urban architectural style, with natural elements like leaves and water incorporated into it. The main prayer hall at ground level is accessible from all sides. The total capacity of the building is at least 4,000 worshippers. The mosque structure was designed by Formwerkz Architects. It has also won an award from the Singapore Institute of Architects.

== Accessibility ==
Masjid Al-Islah is adjacent to the Punggol Temporary Bus Interchange and by extension, the Punggol MRT/LRT station and Waterway Point. It is also within walking distance from Cove LRT station.

== See also ==
- List of mosques in Singapore
