= Masjid Ar-Raudhah =

Mosque in Bukit Batok, Singapore

Masjid Ar-Raudhah مسجد الروضة
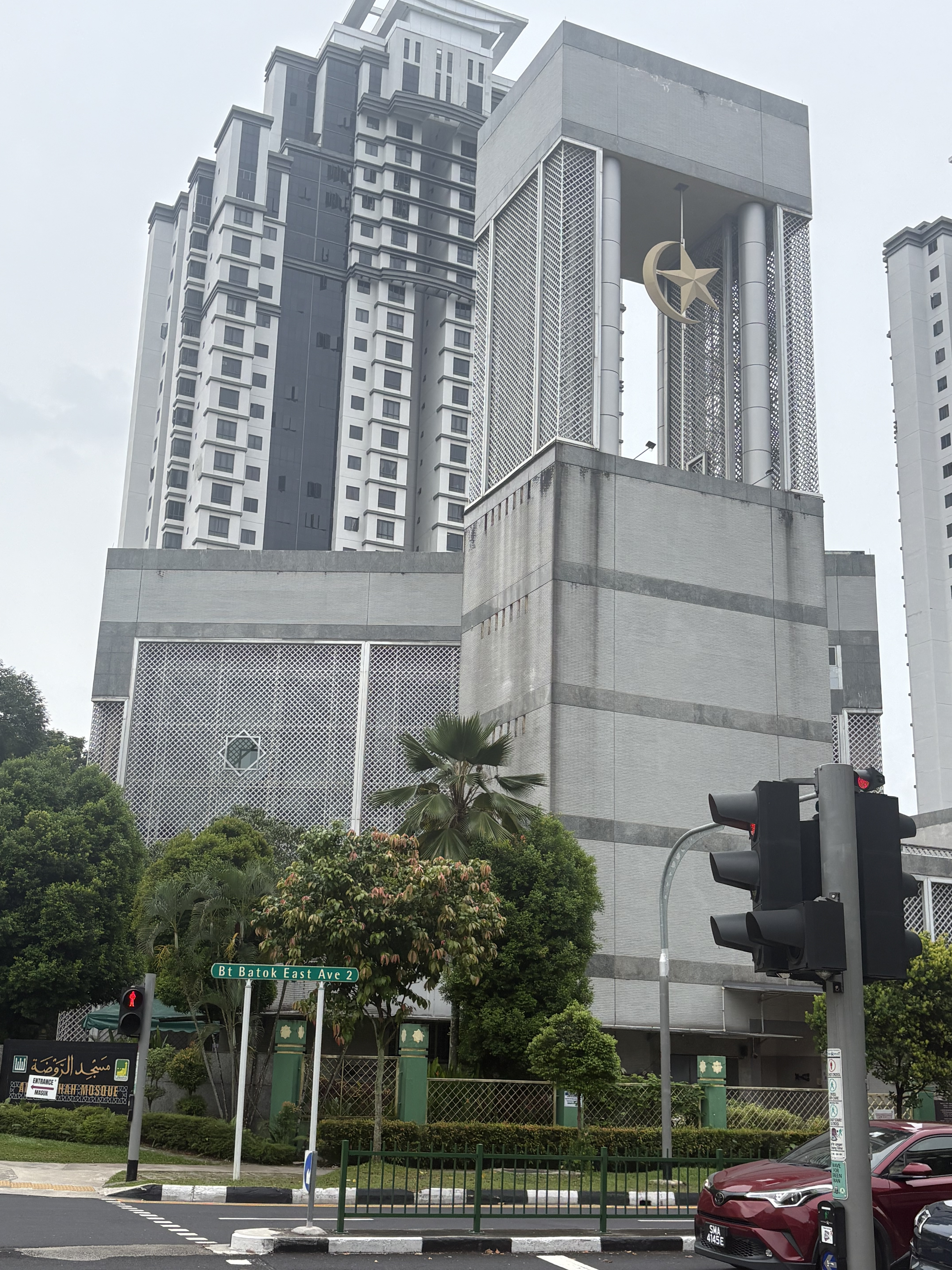
- The main facade of Masjid Ar-Raudhah in 2026.

- Location in Singapore

Religion
- Affiliation: Sunni Islam

Location
- Location: 30 Bukit Batok East Avenue 2, Singapore 659919
- Country: Singapore
- Coordinates: 1.3515015°N 103.7561079°E

Architecture
- Type: Congregational mosque
- Style: Modernist architecture
- Completed: 1992
- Capacity: 3,000

Masjid Ar-Raudhah is a mosque located in Bukit Batok, Singapore. Built in 1992, the mosque serves the neighbourhoods in said planning area, which include Bukit Gombak and Hillview. It is a five-storey building that features modernist architecture and has a capacity of three thousand worshippers.

== Etymology ==
Ar-Raudhah (روضة) is an Arabic word which refers to a place that is full of tranquility. It is also the name of the chamber that houses the remains of the Islamic prophet Muhammad in the city of Medina, Saudi Arabia.

== History ==
As early as 1985, plans were made for the construction of a mosque in the Bukit Batok planning area to serve the Muslims living in both central Bukit Batok as well as other neighborhoods in the area such as Bukit Gombak and Hillview. A plot of land at the foot of the Little Guilin hill along Bukit Batok Avenue 2 was chosen for the mosque, which was named Masjid Ar-Raudhah by the Majlis Ugama Islam Singapura (MUIS). Along with Masjid Kampung Siglap, the mosque was also placed under the second phase of the Mosque Building Fund by the MUIS. After a six-year period of construction work and a cost of $9 million in funding, Masjid Ar-Raudhah was completed in early 1992. The mosque was then officially inaugurated on 24 January 1993, with local politician Sidek Saniff present at the ceremony.

On 8 May 2021, the MUIS announced its plans to extensively renovate four mosques, among them Masjid Ar-Raudhah, with the others being Masjid Darul Makmur, Masjid Alkaff Kampung Melayu and the Darussalam Mosque. Then in April 2026, details of this extensive renovation project were unveiled, which highlighted the expansion of the prayer hall and inclusion of more accessible facilities for elderly congregants. The first phase of the project commenced on 13 July of the same year and by 8 October, it had reached the third phase. The committee of Masjid Ar-Raudhah noted that it was the first renovation project done to the mosque since its inauguration in 1993.

== Architecture ==
Masjid Ar-Raudhah is designed with modernist architecture, its layout skewing off from the main street it is situated along. It has a capacity of three thousand congregants. The mosque has five storeys, with male prayer halls located on almost every level except the second one which is reserved for female worshippers, while the ancillary building behind the mosque contains administrative offices, classrooms, teacher's staff rooms and an Islamic library.

== Transportation ==
Masjid Ar-Raudhah is within walking distance from the Bukit Batok MRT station and shares two bus stops with the neighbouring block 242 of the Bukit Batok East housing estate.

== See also ==
- Islam in Singapore
- List of mosques in Singapore
