= Masjid Pulau Bukom =

Mosque on the island of Pulau Bukom, Singapore

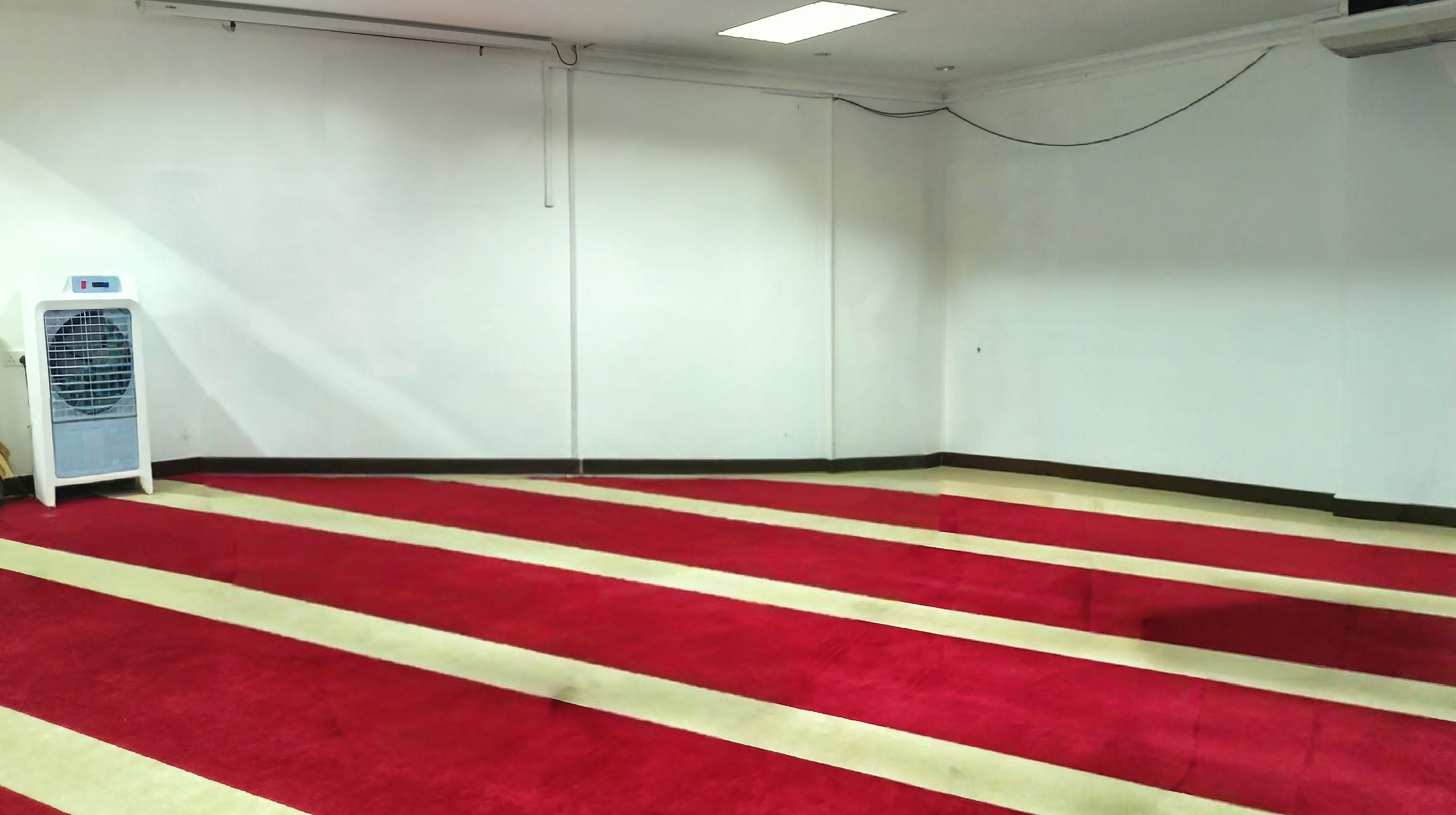
- Unfurnished interior of Masjid Pulau Bukom, during a renovation process in 2026.

- Location in Singapore

Religion
- Affiliation: Sunni Islam

Location
- Location: Pulau Bukom, Singapore 903808
- Country: Singapore
- Interactive map of Masjid Pulau Bukom
- Coordinates: 1.2267614°N 103.7775351°E

Architecture
- Type: Mosque
- Founder: Shell Corporation
- Completed: 1952 (original); 1998 (reconstruction)

Masjid Pulau Bukom is a mosque located on Pulau Bukom, an offshore island of Singapore. Built in 1952 by the Shell Corporation, it is the main place of worship for Muslim workers at the island's oil refineries. The mosque is also the only offshore mosque in Singaporean territory managed by the Majlis Ugama Islam Singapura (MUIS).

== History ==
Masjid Pulau Bukom was originally built in 1952 by the Shell Corporation to accommodate Muslim workers at the oil refineries on Pulau Bukom Besar. It was developed from a wooden surau that stood on the island, with construction officially completed on 22 May 1952. The mosque remained the only place for Abrahamic worship on the island until 1959, when a Roman Catholic church was built nearby. On 17 January 1960, Yusof Ishak, the first president of Singapore, visited the smaller island Pulau Bukom Kechil, which was attached to Pulau Bukom Besar, to plant a tree which served as the foundation stone for the construction of a new mosque. The Majlis Ugama Islam Singapura administered this new mosque by 1978 and authorized it as a place for the collection of Zakat al-Fitr. Between 1974 and 1980, both Pulau Bukom Kechil and Pulau Bukom Besar were merged into a single island named Pulau Bukom; all inhabitants of the island were moved into the mainland to expand the oil refinery, eliminating the need for two mosques. It was eventually decided that the mosque for the former Pulau Bukom Besar would be retained, with the mosque for the former Pulau Bukom Kechil being demolished.

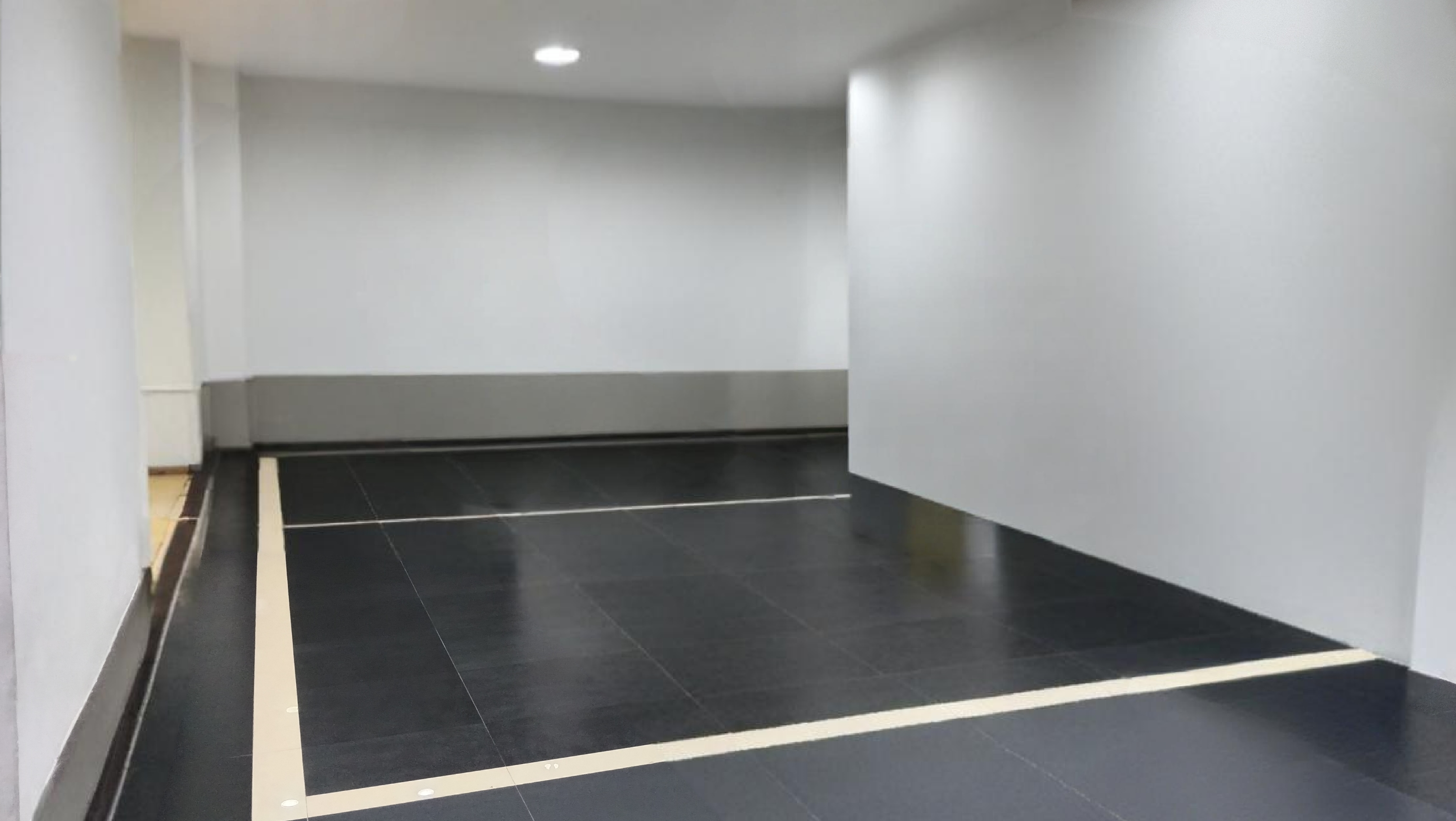
An area in the mosque for worshippers to perform their Iʿtikāf. During Friday prayers, it is used as an extra prayer space to accommodate more worshippers.

In 1998, Masjid Pulau Bukom was rebuilt into a larger, modernized structure, incorporated into the work quarters of workers on the island. This mosque had a capacity of ninety worshippers and was also permitted by the MUIS to carry out the Friday prayers on a weekly basis. It remained notable as the only offshore mosque in Singapore. Unlike most mosques in the country, the functions of the mosque are limited to only Friday prayers and the Eid festive events, with no religious classes or kuliah (religious speeches) being held at the mosque.

== See also ==
- List of mosques in Singapore
