= Kampong Delta Mosque =

Small mosque in the Tiong Bahru, Singapore

Masjid Kampong Delta
- مسجد قرية الدلتا
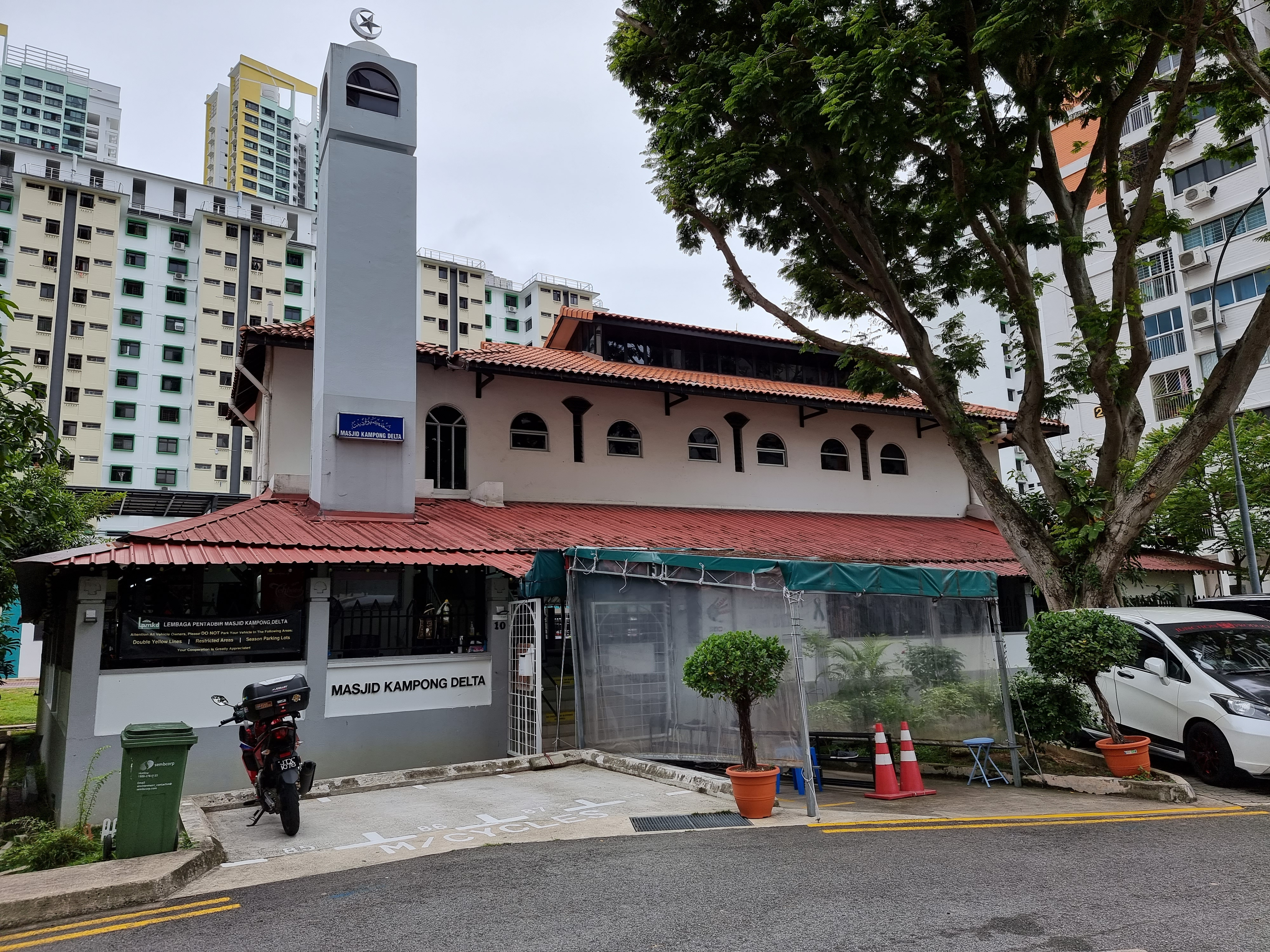

- Location in Singapore

Religion
- Affiliation: Sunni Islam

Location
- Location: 10 Delta Ave, Singapore 169831
- Country: Singapore
- Interactive map of Masjid Kampong Delta
- Coordinates: 1.2915261°N 103.8284109°E

Architecture
- Type: mosque
- Style: Malay architecture
- Established: 1975
- Completed: 1995

Specifications
- Capacity: 500
- Minaret: 1

Masjid Kampong Delta (Jawi: مسجد كامبونغ دلتا) is a mosque located in Bukit Merah, Singapore. Situated within the Delta Avenue residential estate, it is one of the smallest mosques in the country.

== History ==
In 1961, a surau was erected in Kampong Delta, a colonial settlement situated in Bukit Merah, to serve the Muslim inhabitants of that area. It was inaugurated into the registry of the local Islamic council on 1 July 1962 and declared open by Ya'acob bin Mohamed, a Malay diplomat and a member of the Legislative Assembly. In 1974, the surau was selected as a place for the collection of the zakat fitrah payments during the Islamic month of Ramadan. The surau was then upgraded into a full-fledged mosque and reopened in 1977 by Rahmat Kenap, a member of the People's Action Party representing Geylang. Management of the mosque was also transferred to the Majlis Ugama Islam Singapura (MUIS), the Islamic council of the country. The road leading to the mosque, Brahmaputra Road, was also expunged in 1983 in order to make way for the construction of the Delta Avenue residential estate.

In 1985, plans were made to rebuild the mosque in order to incorporate more worshippers. Ultimately, plans for the mosque to be reconstructed into a two-storey structure were approved in 1988, with blueprints designed by a local architectural firm, Design 2000. Construction on the rebuilt mosque took two years, with the mosque officially reopening its doors to the public on 18 October 1990, having been completed a day before. It also received funds as a donation from the treasury of Surau Lorong Fatimah, a surau which had been demolished in 1989 to make way for the Woodlands Checkpoint.

It is one of the smallest mosques in Singapore, with a capacity of 400 worshippers.

== Transportation ==
Masjid Kampong Delta is situated within the Delta Avenue housing estate, along Indus Road and accessible from the Ganges Avenue road in Bukit Merah. The nearest MRT station to the mosque is Havelock MRT station on the Thomson–East Coast Line.

== See also ==
- List of mosques in Singapore
