= Masjid Ahmad =

Mosque located in South Buona Vista, Singapore

- Jawi: مسجد أحمد
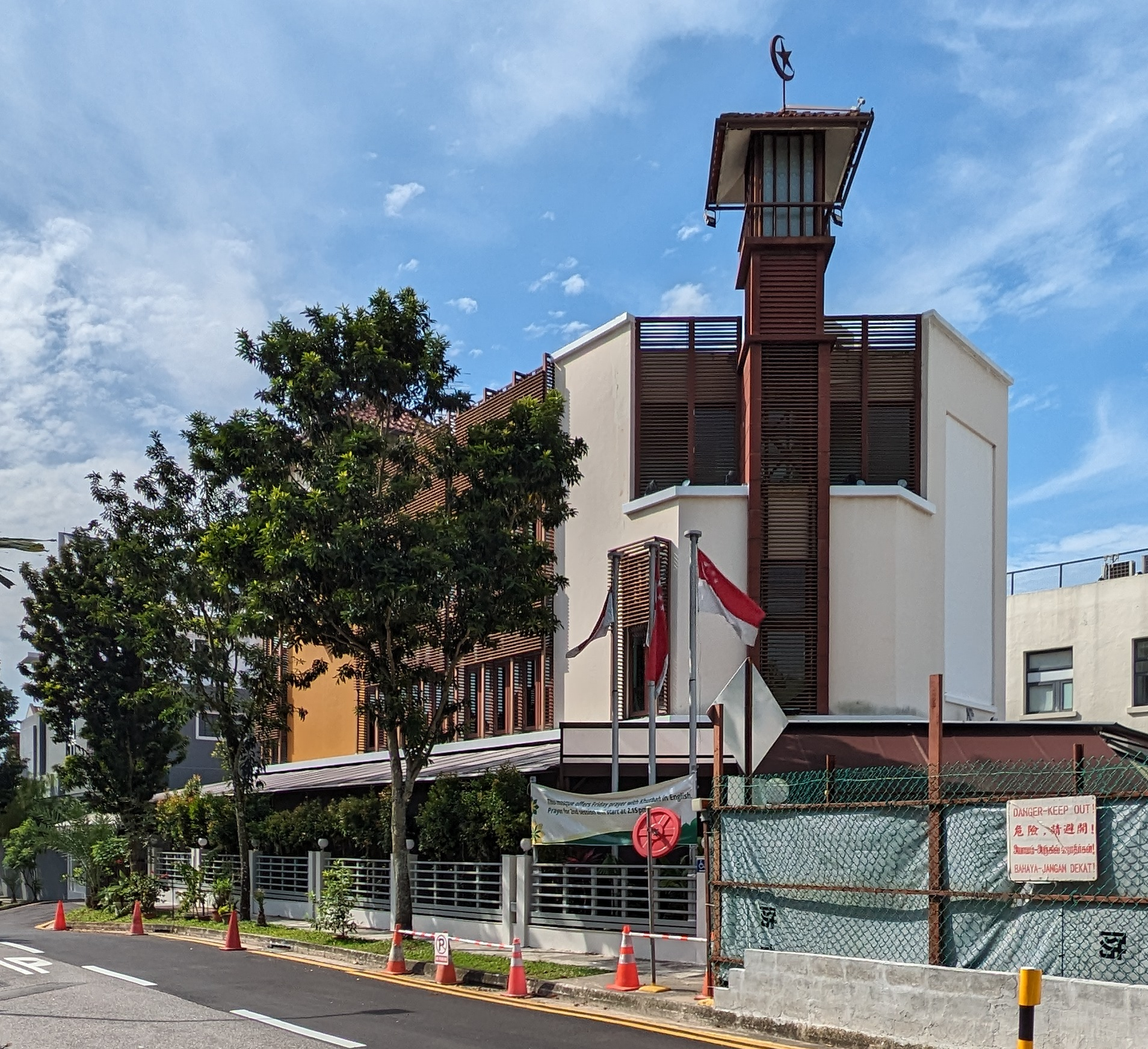

- Location in Singapore

Religion
- Affiliation: Sunni Islam

Location
- Location: 2 Lor Sarhad, Singapore 119173
- Country: Singapore
- Interactive map of Masjid Ahmad
- Coordinates: 1.2809193°N 103.7873064°E

Architecture
- Type: Mosque
- Style: Modern, Malay architecture
- Established: 1934
- Completed: 1934 (original structure); 2004 (current building)

Masjid Ahmad is a mosque located along Lorong Sarhad in South Buona Vista, within the larger planning area of Queenstown, Singapore. It was built in 1934 and named for Ahmad Yahya, who was its main benefactor. Originating as a small surau, the present-day building is a larger 21st century reconstruction.

== History ==
The mosque was built in 1934 on land donated by a former ship captain named Ahmad Yahya. The original mosque was merely a small surau located along Lorong Sarhad, where daily congregational prayers and Jumu'ah were conducted. In 2001, the Majlis Ugama Islam Singapura made the decision to upgrade the mosque in order to expand its capacity to accommodate more worshippers. The old mosque was then torn down and rebuilt from the ground up into the present structure, all of which was completed in 2004.

== Architecture ==
Masjid Ahmad is built in a modern, urbanist architectural style that incorporates elements of traditional Malay architecture. The pyramidal roofs of the mosque are designed to evoke a kampung feel and aesthetic. The mosque's design is also intended to be in tandem with the other terraced houses of Chwee Chian Estate and the shophouses surrounding the mosque in South Buona Vista.

== Gallery ==
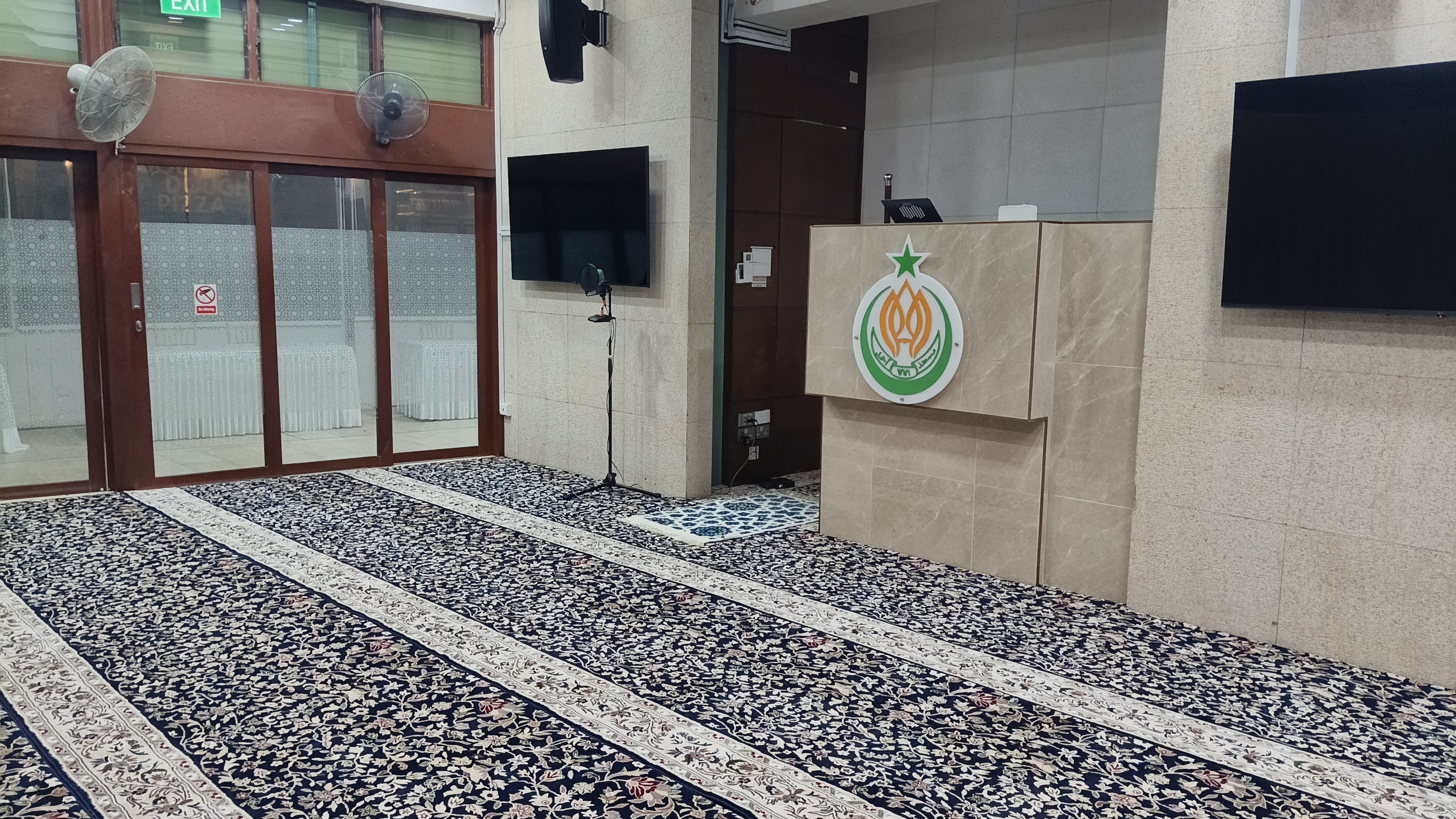
Inside the prayer hall.

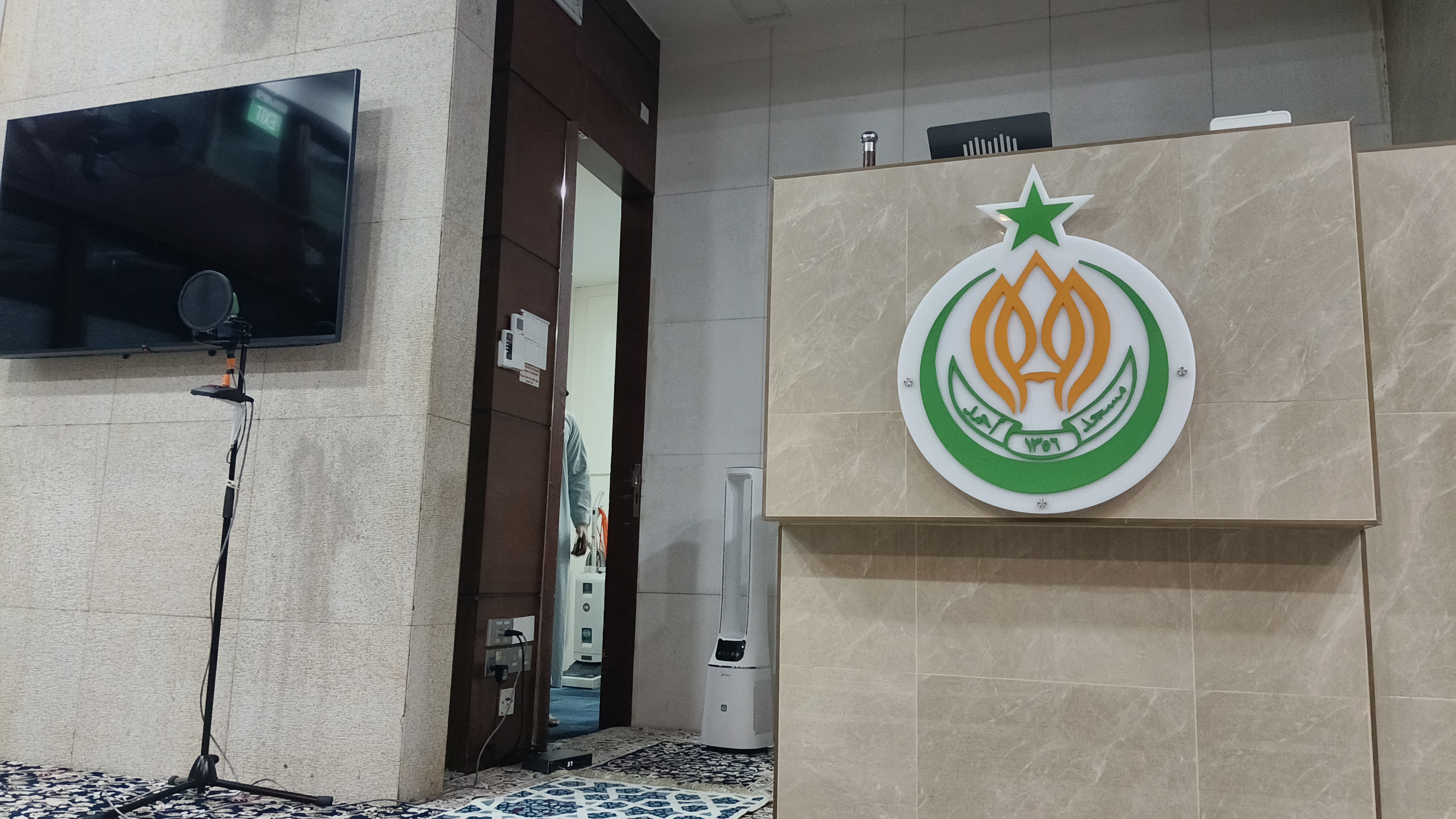
Minbar and qibla of the mosque.

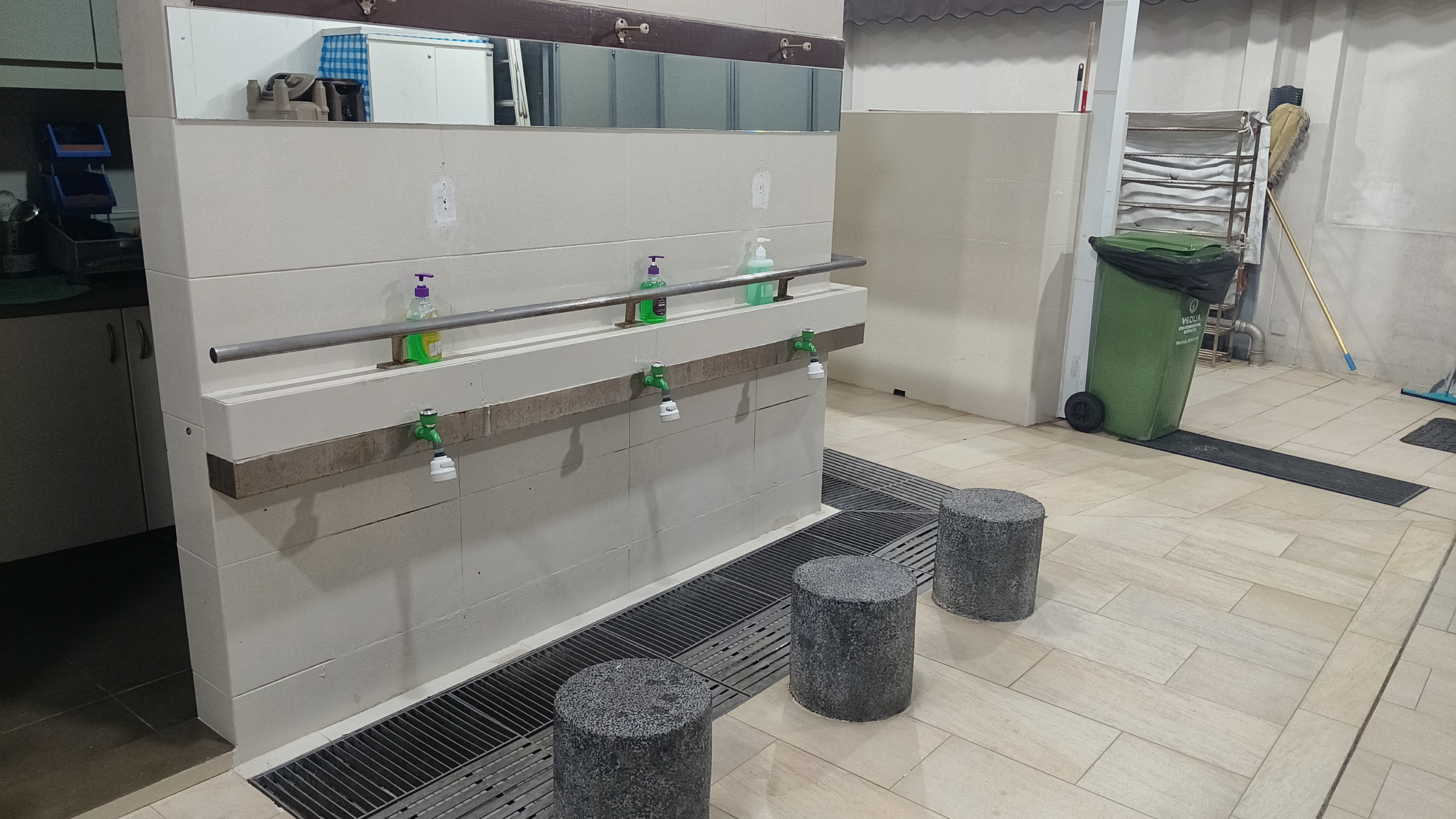
The ablution area, for worshippers to take their wudhu.

== See also ==
- List of mosques in Singapore
