= Masjid Ba'alwie =

Mosque in Bukit Timah, Singapore

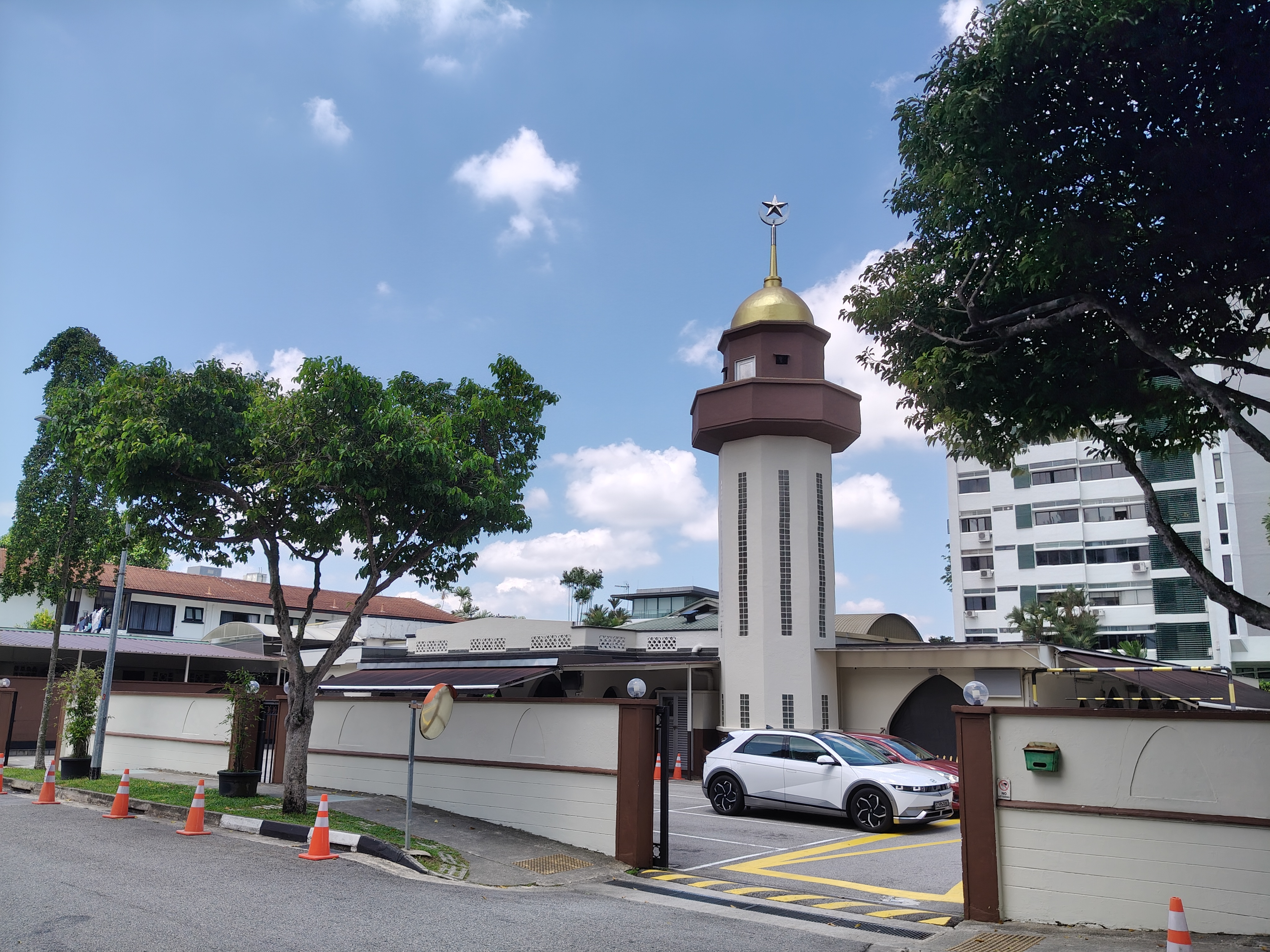

- Location in Singapore

Religion
- Affiliation: Islam

Location
- Location: 2 Lewis Road, Singapore 258590
- Country: Singapore
- Coordinates: 1.3157925°N 103.8974302°E

Architecture
- Founder: Syed Muhammad al-Attas
- Completed: 1952

Masjid Ba'alwie is a mosque located in Bukit Timah, Singapore. Built in 1952 by a cleric from the Ba'alawi clan, it stands at the junction of Lewis Road and Bukit Timah Road. A non-denominational mosque, it holds interfaith activities and is managed by the Habib al-Attas family.

== History ==
The mosque was built in 1952 by Syed Muhammad al-Attas, a cleric from the Ba'alawi clan that claimed descent from the Islamic prophet Muhammad. His family, known as the Habib al-Attas, were appointed as trustees and managers of both the mosque and Masjid Haji Yusoff at Hougang. In 1968, the newly-formed Majlis Ugama Islam Singapura (MUIS) took over the administration of Masjid Ba'alwie. However, the Habib al-Attas family was allowed to retain their positions under close supervision from the MUIS. After the events of the September 11 bombings and the War on Terror happening in America, the committee of Masjid Ba'alwie became focused on steering youth away from the rising amount of self-radicalisation, hosting interfaith events and organizing anti-radicalisation programmes and forums at the mosque. The funeral for Harun bin Abdul Ghani, a former Political Secretary at the Ministry of Home Affairs and a Member-of-Parliament, was held in the main prayer hall of Masjid Ba'alwie in 2005.

On 8 July 2018, the mosque was visited by representatives of Cornerstone Community Church, a church at Katong. This visit was intended to foster better relationships between Christians and Muslims living in the Bukit Timah area. A month before, the mosque had also received twenty kilograms of rice that were donated by Amitabha Association, a local Buddhist organization, with the rice being distributed to residents around the mosque. Later in 2019, the mosque gained widespread local praise after the mosque's committee hung a banner outside the building wishing a happy Chinese New Year to passersby and visitors. During the nationwide COVID-19 pandemic, the mosque was closed down, but reopened after the Circuit Breaker period had ended.

The head preacher of the mosque, Habib Hassan al-Attas, received the Achiever of the Year Award from the Berita Harian in October 2019. Earlier in 2016, Al-Attas had confirmed that Masjid Ba'alwie was open to all faiths and was a non-denominational mosque for both Sunni Muslims and Shi'ites. Al-Attas had also established a museum within the mosque, where Islamic artifacts are displayed alongside artifacts from other religions, which include scrolls of a Bible, Torah, and the Talmud.

== Transportation ==
Situated at the junction of Lewis Road and Bukit Timah Road, Masjid Ba'alwie is accessible from the Stevens MRT station.

== See also ==
- List of mosques in Singapore
