= Blue Mosque, Singapore =

First mosque built in Woodlands, Singapore

- Masjid An-Nur
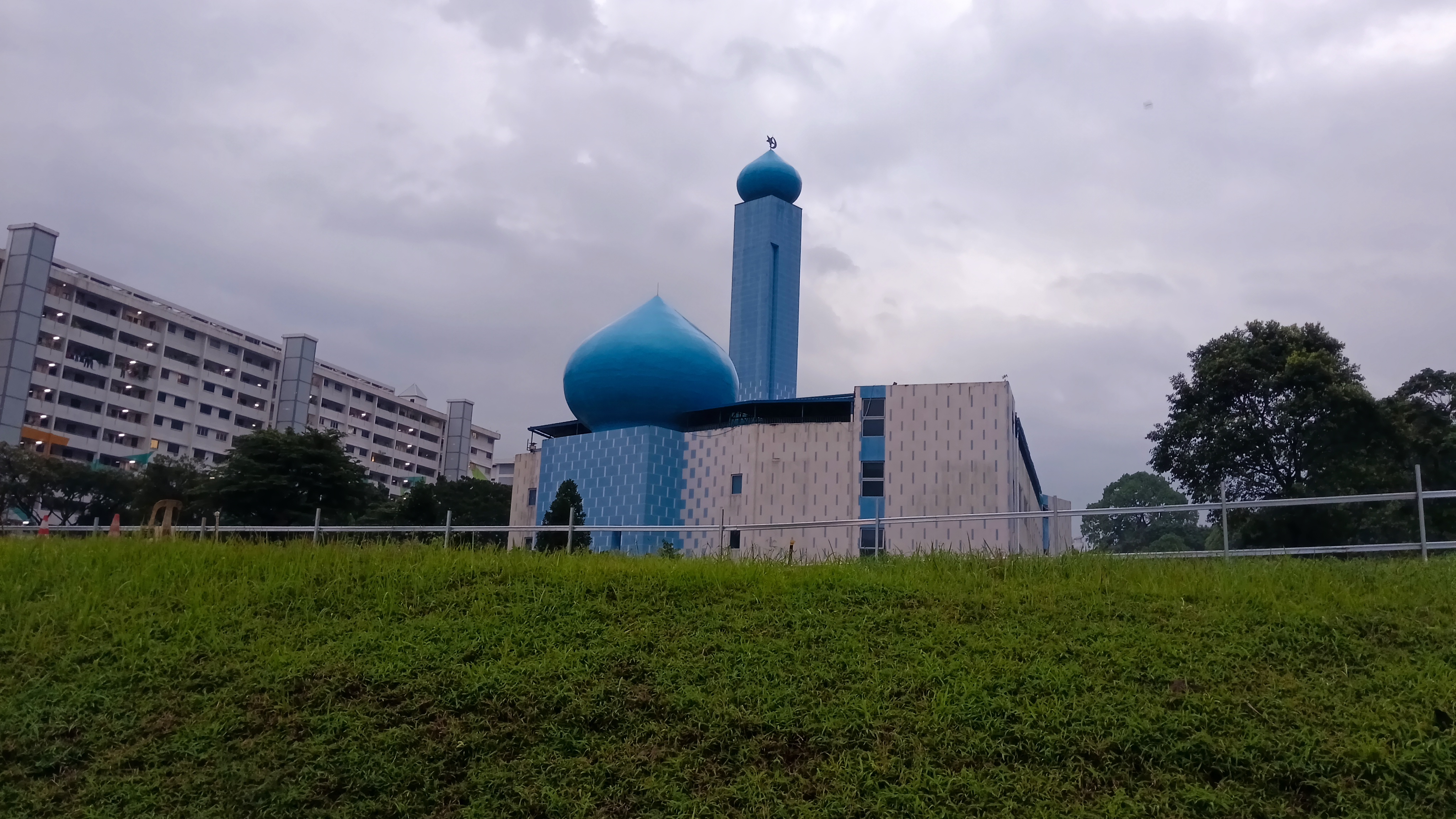
- The mosque as seen from the Woodlands Checkpoint.

- Location in Singapore

Religion
- Affiliation: Sunni Islam

Location
- Location: 6 Admiralty Rd, Singapore 739983
- Country: Singapore
- Interactive map of Blue Mosque, Singapore
- Coordinates: 1.4409299°N 103.7719226°E

Architecture
- Architect: Tony Tan Keng Joo
- Type: Mosque
- Style: Modern, Islamic architecture
- Completed: 1980

Specifications
- Dome: 1
- Minaret: 1
- Minaret height: 55 metres

Masjid An-Nur, later called the Blue Mosque (Jawi: مسجد کبود; Malay: Masjid Biru), is a mosque located in the Marsiling neighbourhood inside Woodlands, Singapore. Built in 1980, it is the first mosque to be built in Woodlands. Well known for its predominantly blue colour scheme and imposing minaret, the mosque is also adjacent to the Woodlands Checkpoint that connects the traffic of Johor and Singapore.

== Etymology ==
The name of the mosque, An-Nur, is an Arabic word that means "The Light" and is the title of a chapter from the Qur'an, specifically the twenty-fourth chapter. The mosque was later popularly known as the Blue Mosque although it still remains with its former name on governmental databases.

== History ==
Plans to construct a mosque in the Woodlands neighborhood were confirmed in 1978, with a scale model being made as well. The foundation stone for a new mosque, Masjid An-Nur, was mounted at the building site in 1979 by Sidek Saniff, a Member-of-Parliament for the Kolam Ayer area. Construction on the mosque was completed by March 1980, however the mosque still had insufficient funds to operate. Finally, it was opened to the public by the Senior Minister of State, Rahim Ishak, on 20 April 1980.

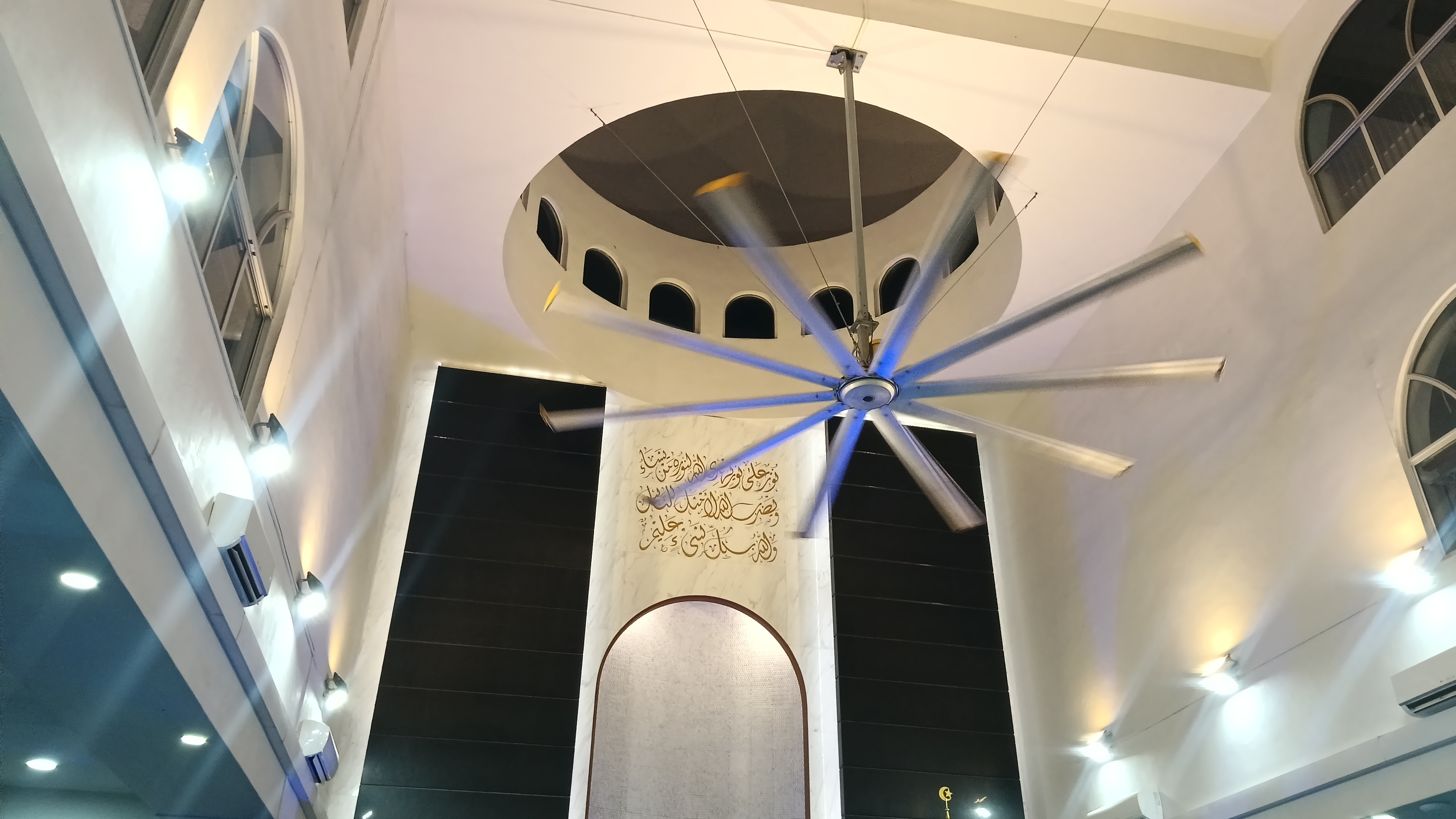
The interior of the Blue Mosque was designed by Housing and Development Board architect, Tony Tan Keng Joo.

Due to its close proximity to the Woodlands Checkpoint, the mosque was a popular destination for travellers coming to Singapore from Johor. The mosque was extensively renovated in 2013, expanding its prayer hall and doubling its capacity to fit six thousand worshippers. It was reopened on 26 May of that same year after all minor reparations had been completed.

== Architecture ==
The mosque is built in a modernist architectural style, with references to traditional Islamic architecture. The front of the main prayer hall is topped by a large blue onion dome. There is a single fifty-five metres high minaret, situated at the western side of the mosque and topped by a smaller onion dome. Wooden carvings and batik patterns are present as decorative elements inside the main prayer hall. Due to the predominately blue colour of the mosque, it has received the name of "Blue Mosque" akin to other mosques in Turkey, Iran and Afghanistan.

== Gallery ==
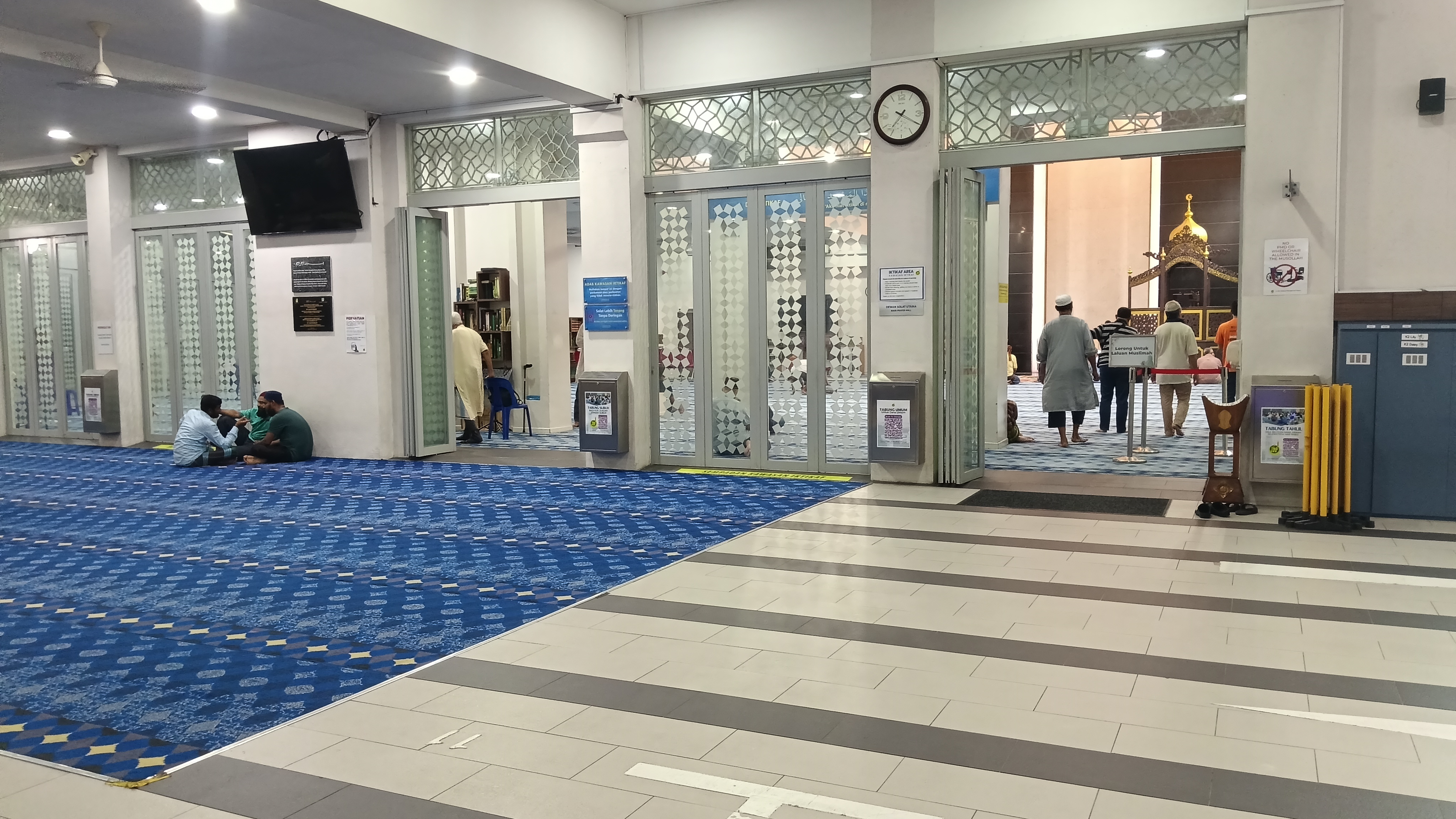
A carpeted area for Iʿtikāf outside the main prayer hall.

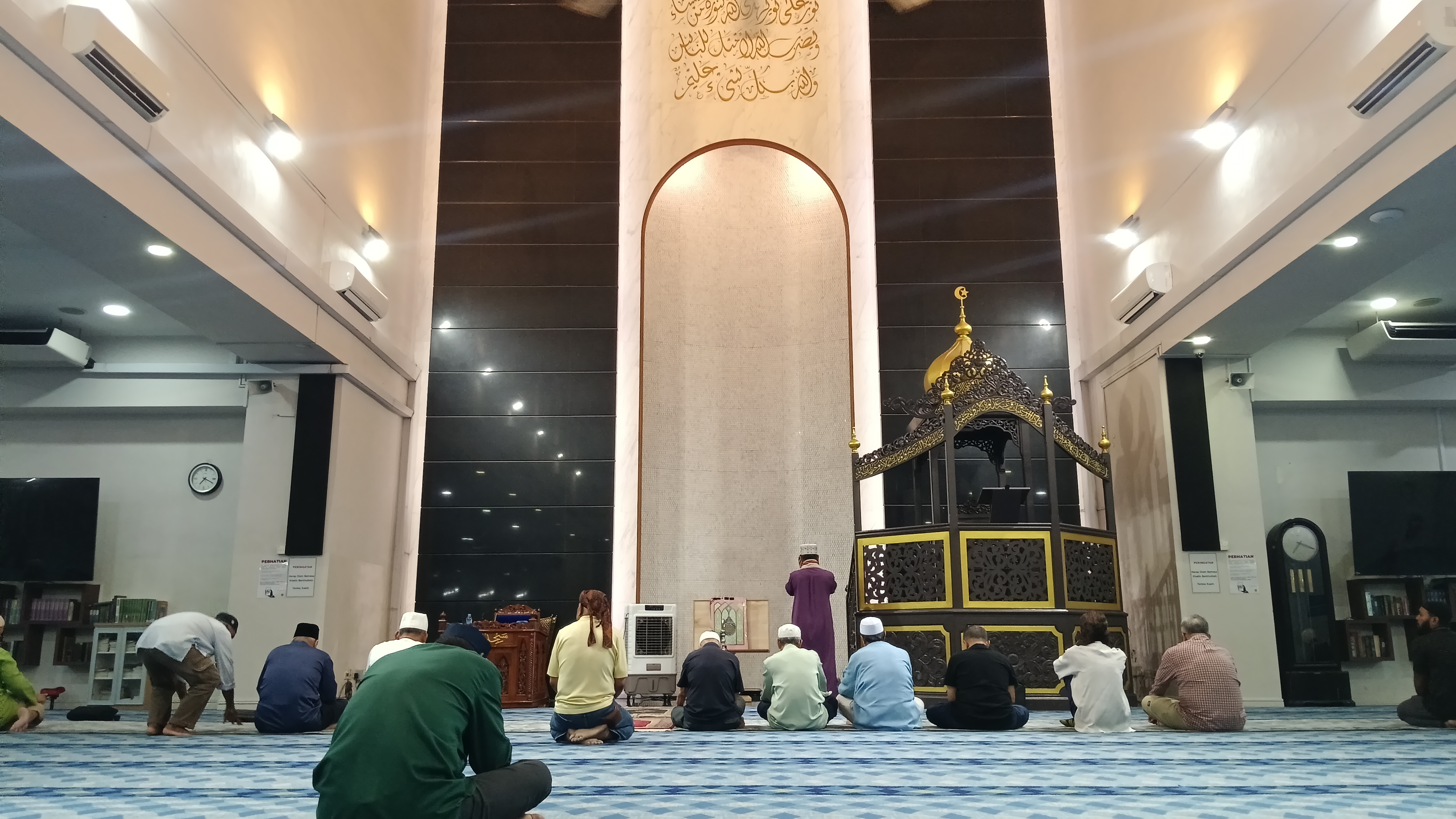
The main prayer hall of the mosque.

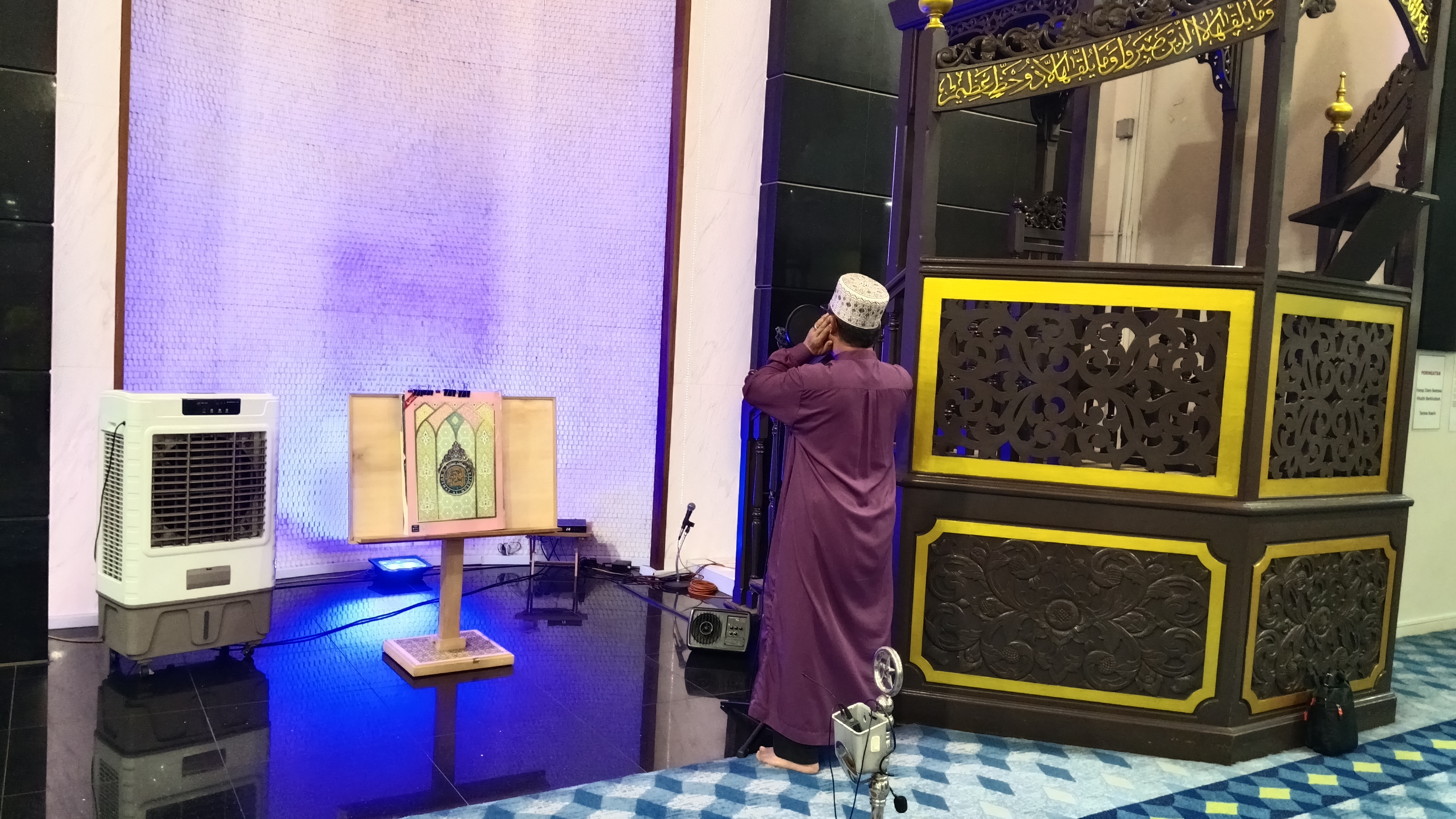
The muezzin reciting the call to prayer in the mosque.

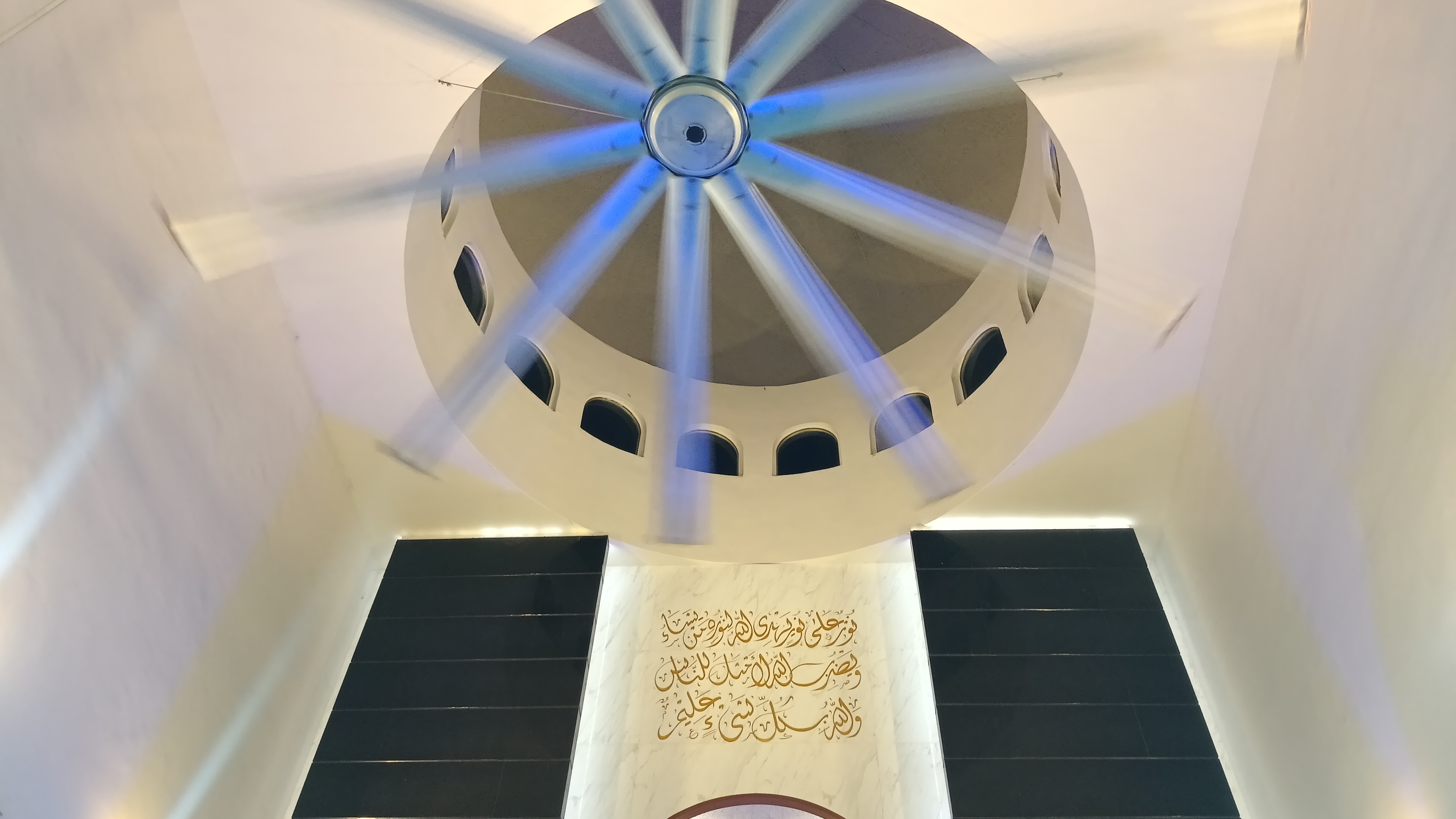
View underneath the dome of the mosque.

== See also ==
- Islam in Singapore
- List of mosques in Singapore
