= Masjid An-Nahdhah =

Mosque located in Bishan, Singapore

Masjid An-Nahdhah مسجد النهضة
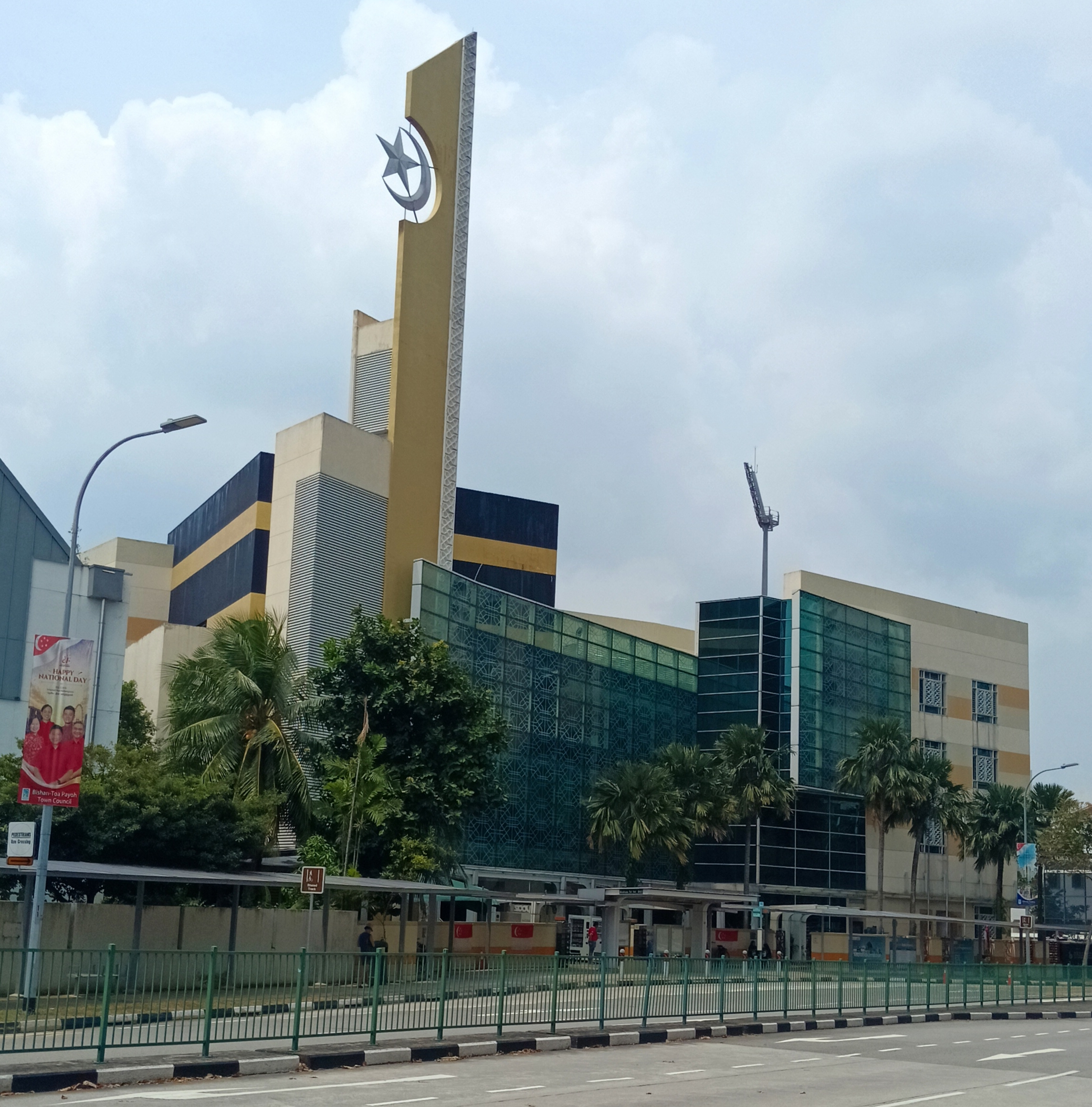
- Masjid An-Nahdhah in 2026.

- Location in Singapore

Religion
- Affiliation: Sunni Islam

Location
- Location: 9A Bishan Street 14, Singapore 579786
- Country: Singapore
- Coordinates: 1.3534831°N 103.8512502°E

Architecture
- Type: Islamic cultural centre with a mosque, madrasa and museum
- Style: Modernist architecture
- Completed: 2006

Masjid An-Nahdhah (Jawi: مسجد النهضة) is an Islamic religious complex located in Bishan, Singapore. The complex comprises a congregational mosque, madrasa, as well as a small museum known as the Harmony Centre. Built in 2006, it is situated behind the Bishan Stadium and adjacent to the Bishan MRT station.

== History ==
In 2003, the Majlis Ugama Islam Singapura (MUIS) confirmed plans for the construction of a religious complex named Masjid An-Nahdhah which would be composed of a congregational mosque as well as a madrasa for preschoolers and a museum for interfaith tolerance, known as the "Harmony Centre." The total cost of construction was estimated to be at least $1.2 million. The project was later moved to the sixth phase of the Mosque Building Fund, an initiative by the MUIS to help in the establishment of mosques throughout the country. A spot behind the Bishan Stadium along Bishan Street 14 was chosen for the construction of the building. Ultimately, Masjid An-Nahdhah was completed on 3 January 2006 and officially opened to the public two days later.

== Harmony Centre ==
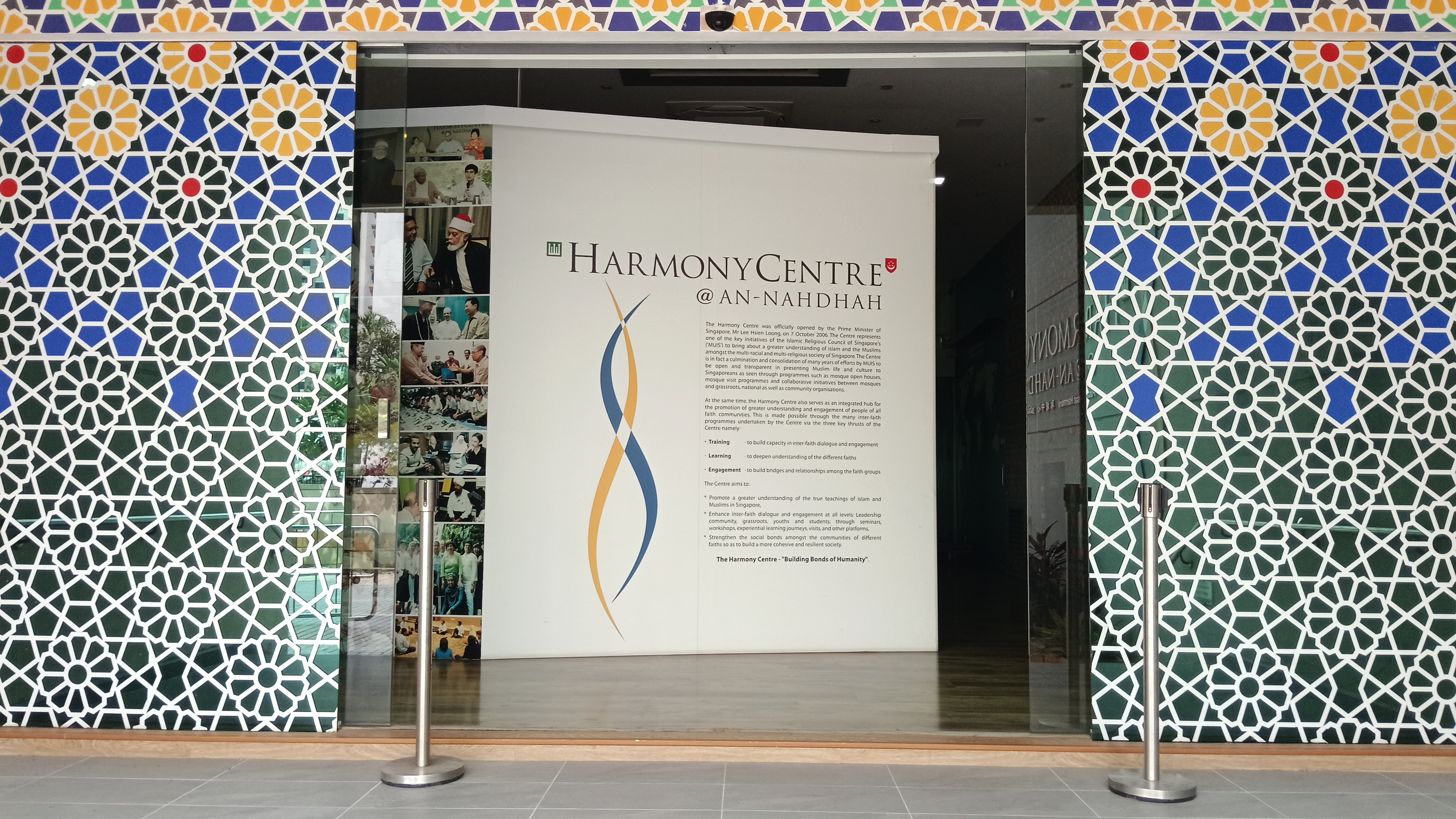
The main entrance to the Harmony Centre.

The Harmony Centre is a museum within the compound of Masjid An-Nahdhah. The museum contains exhibits relating to Islamic history and culture, such as Qur'anic manuscripts in different styles of Arabic writing. There are also artifacts belonging to different religions on display in the museum, such as Buddhist prayer beads and manuscripts of the Bible and Torah. The Harmony Centre is managed by the committee of Masjid An-Nahdhah in cooperation with the MUIS.

== Diplomatic visits ==
- On 17 October 2006, Abdullah Md Zin, then a Minister in the Prime Minister's Department of Terengganu, visited Masjid An-Nahdhah and enjoyed a guided tour of the Harmony Centre.
- On 30 August 2015, during a three-day diplomatic meeting in Singapore, Egyptian president Abdel Fattah El-Sisi visited Masjid An-Nahdhah, meeting with several representatives of the MUIS and interfaith religious leaders at the Harmony Centre. After the visit, El-Sisi later visited the Botanic Gardens to witness the naming of an orchid flower after him, the Dendrobium Abdel Fattah Al Sisi. This visit marked the first time an Egyptian president had ever visited Singapore since the establishment of political ties in 1966.
- On 31 October 2017, Charles III of the United Kingdom was given a guided tour of Masjid An-Nahdhah and the Harmony Centre by Mohammad Hannan Hassan, a deputy director at the MUIS for interfaith activities. The tour was later by visits to other national monuments of Singapore and concluded with a dinner at the Istana hosted by Halimah Yacob, the then-President of Singapore. The next day, Charles III made preparations to leave Singapore, heading to Malaysia for a diplomatic visit to Penang.

== Transportation ==
Masjid An-Nahdhah is situated behind the Bishan Stadium and is directly accessible from the Bishan MRT station, within a 500 metre distance.

== See also ==
- Islam in Singapore
- List of mosques in Singapore
