= List of mosques in Singapore =

External image
- The mosque, pictured in 1986.

There are a total of 72 mosques in Singapore. Almost all of the mosques in Singapore are administered by the local Islamic council, the Majlis Ugama Islam Singapura (MUIS), with the exception of Masjid Temenggong Daeng Ibrahim, Masjid Taha and the Islamic Centre Jamiyah. Generally, mosques in Singapore adhere to Sunni Islam; the only exception is Masjid Burhani, which is affiliated with the Dawoodi Bohras, a sect of Shia Islam.

Two more mosques in Tampines and Choa Chu Kang have been planned for the early 2030s.

== List of mosques ==
=== Mosques on the mainland ===
There are a total of sixty-nine mosques on mainland Singapore.

Name	Images	Capacity	Completed	Description	Citations
Masjid Abdul Aleem Siddique		400	1957	Named for Muhammad Abdul Aleem Siddiqi, the founder of Jamiyah Singapore.	
Masjid Abdul Gaffoor		3,000	1859	Gazetted as a national monument of Singapore.	
Masjid Abdul Hamid		300	1932	Named after Abdul Hamid Marang, the founder of the mosque.	
Masjid Ahmad		400	1934	Named after Ahmad Yahya, the founder of the mosque.	
Masjid Ahmad Ibrahim		200	1958	Named after Ahmad bin Ibrahim, a politician who founded the mosque.	
Masjid Al-Abdul Razak		300	1965	The mosque was originally exclusive to male worshippers.	
Masjid Al-Abrar		500	1827	Gazetted as a national monument of Singapore.	
Masjid Al-Amin		3,000	1991	Built partially because the older Masjid Radin Mas was too small.	
Masjid Al-Ansar		3,000	1981	Built in 1981 under the first phase of the Mosque Building Fund. At construction, it was the only mosque in Chai Chee.	
Masjid Al-Falah		3,000	1987	The mosque is the only one situated in the Orchard district, and was built as a replacement for an older mosque, Masjid Taman Angullia.	
Masjid Al-Huda		400	1966	The only mosque that serves the Sixth Avenue housing estate, which consists of mainly landed properties, while also being one of two mosques located in Bukit Timah.	
Masjid Al-Iman		5,000	2003	Serves the residents of Bukit Panjang; located near Bangkit LRT station.	
Masjid Al-Islah		4,000	2015	Originally announced in 2013, it is the only mosque in the Punggol neighbourhood.	
Masjid Al-Istighfar		3,000	1999	Also known as the Blue Mosque, its architectural style is inspired by the Sultanahmet Mosque in Istanbul.	
Masjid Al-Istiqamah		3,000	1999	Located in northern Serangoon, at the junction of Yio Chu Kang Road and Ang Mo Kio Road.	
Masjid Alkaff Kampung Melayu		3,000	1999	One of two mosques in Singapore that are built by the influential Alkaff family, it replaces an older mosque in Bedok.	
Masjid Alkaff Upper Serangoon		3,000	1921	Built by the Alkaff family, it is known for its eclectic architectural style that includes Ottoman architectureal features. It was also restored in 2014 and later gazetted as a national monument.	
Masjid Al-Khair		3,000	1997	Located on the central parts of Choa Chu Kang.	
Masjid Al-Mawaddah		5,000	2009	The only mosque in the Sengkang and Buangkok area, it is also the first to have an eco-friendly design.	
Masjid Al-Mukminin		3,000	1997	It is recognizable for its roof, a 10-pointed star that resembles the National Mosque of Malaysia.	
Masjid Al-Muttaqin		3,000	1980	Located in central Ang Mo Kio.	
Masjid Al-Taqua		400	1883	Located at the end of Jalan Bilal in Bedok.	
Masjid Angullia		2,500	1892	Indian Muslim mosque, founded by the Angullia family. It is a heritage site of Little India. The mosque is also the former headquarters of the Tablighi Jama'at association.	
Masjid An-Nahdhah		4,000	2006	Within the mosque is the Harmony Centre, a museum which contains exhibits and relics relating to Islamic history, while also promoting multifaith harmony.	
Masjid An-Nur		3,000	1980	Also known as the Blue Mosque, it is situated near the Woodlands Checkpoint.	
Masjid Ar-Raudhah		3,000	1993	The mosque opened in 1993 and is located in Bukit Batok.	
Masjid Assyafaah		4,000	2004	First modern post-independence mosque in Singapore that does not have a dome or a minaret.	
Masjid Assyakirin		5,000	1977	Located in the Taman Jurong residential precinct of the wider Jurong planning area.	
Masjid Ba'alwie		400	1952	Built in 1952 by Syed Muhammad al-Attas, a cleric from the Ba'alawi clan that claimed descent from the Islamic prophet Muhammad.	
Masjid Bencoolen		1,100	1828	Built in 1828 as a wooden surau, but later rebuilt into a larger mosque by Syed Omar Aljunied.	
Masjid Darul Aman		3,500	1986	Built to replace a former mosque, Masjid Aminah, that was situated in the area but had to be demolished to make way for redevelopments.	
Masjid Darul Ghufran		5,500	1990	The largest mosque in Singapore (by capacity).	
Masjid Darul Makmur		2,500	1989	Completely rebuilt in 2025 and reopened on the Eid al-Adha festival of that year.	
Masjid Darussalam		3,000	1989	Built in an architectural style inspired by ancient Egyptian architecture.	
Masjid En-Naeem		2,500	1983	Located in Kovan, a neighbourhood in Hougang.	
Masjid Haji Mohd Salleh		2,000	1896	Salafi mosque located along Geylang Road. It is situated in the centre of the red light district.	
Masjid Haji Muhammad Salleh		500	1903	The mosque is part of the Keramat Habib Noh, a religious complex centred around the mausoleum-shrine of Habib Noh Al Habsyi, Sufi mystic. The mosque is a latter addition and the mausoleum was built first, in the 1890s. Both buildings were rebuilt in 1989.	
Masjid Haji Yusoff		2,500	1921	A heritage site of Hougang, the present day structure is a 1990s reconstruction.	
Masjid Hajjah Fatimah		2,500	1845	Built in 1845, it is named after its founder, Fatimah binte Sulaiman, who is buried in the mosque along with most of her family members and relatives. It has also been gazetted as a national monument of Singapore.	
Masjid Hajjah Rahimabi Kebun Limau		500	1959	Originally known as Masjid Kebul Limau, after the lime plantations ("kebun limau") that stood in Balestier. It was rebuilt in 1984 by Hajjah Rahima Bee, a member of the Angullia family.	
Masjid Hang Jebat		600	1952	Situated near the Rail Corridor, where the former KTM tracks once lied.	
Masjid Hasanah		2,500	1970	Located in the Teban Gardens neighbourhood, the present mosque is a late 1980s reconstruction.	
Masjid Hussain Sulaiman		300	1902	One of the oldest surviving mosques in the Pasir Panjang district in Queenstown.	
Masjid Jamae		1,500	1830s	Established by South Indian merchants and workers, known as the Chulias. The original mosque was completed in the 1830s and has seen very little changes to the structure, with the exception of a modernised ablution area and the removal of one of the gateways facing Mosque Street, that runs parallel to the mosque. It has been gazetted as a national monument of the country.	
Masjid Jamek Queenstown		400	1964	Part of the Queenstown Heritage Trail, along with Masjid Hang Jebat.	
Masjid Jamiyah Ar-Rabitah		2,000	1962	Originally built in 1962, the present day structure is a 1985 reconstruction. The former mosque did not have a dome and was smaller in size.	
Masjid Kampong Delta		500	1975	One of the smallest mosques in Singapore.	
Masjid Kampung Siglap		3,000	1846	Originally built as a surau by a Malay noblewoman, Hajjah Hajijah, before it was converted into a mosque in 1902 by Tok Lasam. Expanded in 1992 to accommodate population growth in Siglap.	
Masjid Kassim		2,000	1921	Founded by Ahna Mohamed Kassim, who also founded the Kubur Kassim necropolis.	
Masjid Khadijah		1,000	1920	Sufi mosque, founded by an Indian Muslim merchant named Khadijah binti Muhammad.	
Masjid Khalid		4,000	1907	Named after its founder, Haji Abdul Khalid, who built a mosque for Nasi Kandar peddlers in the area.	
Masjid Maarof		4,000	2016	Named in memory of an older mosque in Kampong Glam that was demolished to make way for redevelopments.	
Masjid Malabar		1,000	1918	The only mosque in Singapore that is managed by the Malabar Muslim Jama'ath, a predominately Indian Muslim organisation. Part of the Kampong Glam heritage sites. Behind the mosque is a private cemetery containing the tombs of the Koya Thangals (South Indian scholars from Kerala) as well as the tomb of Ambo Sooloh.	
Masjid Moulana Mohamed Ali		800	1994	Attached to the UOB Plaza, it is the only underground mosque in Singapore.	
Masjid Muhajirin		1,400	1977	It is part of the Singapore Islamic Hub, which comprises a madrasa, the mosque, as well as offices for the Islamic council.	
Masjid Mujahidin		1,000	1977	Situated along Stirling Road, it is the most recent mosque built in the Queenstown neighbourhood.	
Masjid Mydin		1,000	1935	Originally founded as a surau by an Indian merchant. It was later converted into a full-fledged mosque.	
Masjid Omar Kampong Melaka		500	1820	The earliest surviving mosque in Singapore, predating even Masjid Sultan. It was founded by Syed Omar Aljunied. The minaret of the mosque was added in the 1980s reconstructions of the site. Next to the mosque is a private burial ground of the Aljunied family.	
Masjid Omar Salmah		300	1973	Built on TOL (Temporary Occupation License) land, the mosque was founded by an Arab merchant who named it after his parents Omar and Salmah.	
Masjid Pusara Aman		200	1972	Serves the Pusara Aman Muslim Cemetery that is part of the Islamic sector of the wider Choa Chu Kang Cemetery.	
Masjid Petempatan Melayu Sembawang		300	1963	Known for its secluded location, far away from public transport and housing.	
Masjid Sallim Mattar		300	1963	Adjacent to the Mattar MRT station, located on the Downtown Line.	
Masjid Sultan		5,000	1826	The most well-known mosque in Singapore. It has been gazetted as a national monument.	
Masjid Tasek Utara		120	1907	The smallest mosque in Singapore. Originated as a surau before it was converted into a mosque after 1965. The present-day structure is a 2017 reconstruction.	
Masjid Tentera Diraja		1,000	1961	Built by Muslim soldiers serving under the British.	

=== Mosques located offshore ===
There is one mosque located on Singaporean offshore territory.

Name	Images	Capacity	Completed	Description	Citations
Masjid Pulau Bukom		100	1952	Originally a village mosque, it was rebuilt in 1998 as a mosque that only serves workers and visitors in Pulau Bukom.	

=== Mosques that are not under the purview of the MUIS ===
The following mosques are active but not managed by the MUIS.

Name	Images	Capacity	Completed	Description	Citations
Masjid Temenggong Daeng Ibrahim		1,000	1845	Named after Temenggong Daeng Ibrahim, the second Temenggong of Johor. The mosque is under the purview of the Jabatan Agama Islam Johor, which manages the mosque. The workers in the mosque, including the Imam and the muezzin, are from Johor.	
Piperdi Angullia Mosque		500	1985	The mosque is situated on the second level of the Islamic Centre Jamiyah, funded by the prestigious Angullia family.	
Admiralty Yard Mosque	N/A	100	2002	Built for Muslim workers in the Admiralty Yard. Next to the mosque is a Hindu temple, for Hindu workers. Both are maintained by the Shipbuilding and Marine Engineering Employees' Union.	

=== Former mosques ===
These mosques have either been abandoned, are no longer used for prayer, or have been demolished to make way for redevelopments and urbanisation. Some of their roles have also been undertaken by larger mosques managed by MUIS.

Name	Images	Completed	Deprecated or demolished	Description	Citations
Masjid Bidadari	N/A	1932	2007	Built with a minaret modelled after the Masjid al-Haram in Mecca. Demolished in 2007 for redundancy following the exhumation of Bidadari Cemetery for housing, which occurred from the 1970s to the early 2000s.	
Masjid Al-Ma'arof	N/A	1870	1996	Recognisable for its Javanese architectural style as well as a pool for ablution. Another mosque, located in Jurong West, was named after it during the planning process.	
Masjid Aminah	N/A	1959	Unknown (after 1986)	Named for main benefactor Minah Palembang. Renovated and expanded in 1971. Replaced by the larger Masjid Darul Aman following demolition.	
Masjid Bukit Kasita		c. 1930s	Unknown	Located at the site of the Keramat Bukit Kasita cemetery-shrine, which is hidden in the foliage of the Bukit Purmei housing estate.	
Masjid Bukit Larangan	N/A	Unknown	1975	In 1971, Malay newspaper Berita Harian reported the existence of a small mosque being attached to the monumental tomb-shrine of the semi-legendary king Iskandar Shah at Bukit Larangan, described as having a zinc roof. The mosque and other adjoining facilities were demolished by 1975, while the tomb-shrine, now known as Keramat Iskandar Shah, was retained and upgraded over the years and gradually lost its religious affiliation.	
Masjid Jamiur Rahmah		Unknown	1989	Served the staff of the now-demolished Woodbridge Hospital, as well as residents of Kampong Lorong Buangkok.	
Masjid Kampong Holland		1974	2014	The former surau was converted into a mosque in 1988, after a member of its committee requested so in 1976 due to the prohibition of the Friday prayer in suraus. It was demolished in 2014.	
Masjid Radin Mas	N/A	1920	2001	Named for Radin Mas, a Malay princess whose mausoleum was near the site of the mosque. Closed in 2001 for urban redevelopment, with the larger and more advanced Masjid Al-Amin serving as the main mosque in Telok Blangah.	
Masjid Wak Sumang	External image: The mosque, pictured at an unknown date.	Unknown	1995	Served the Kampung Wak Sumang village in Punggol, and had behind itself a cemetery where a Wah Soomang and his wife were interred. Demolished alongside the broader village to facilitate the redevelopment of Punggol.	

== List of suraus ==
A surau is an Islamic assembly building, smaller than a mosque, where the daily prayers are held along with the two festive prayers and Tarawih. Five suraus exist in Singapore.

Name	Images	Capacity	Completed	Description	Citations
Surau Al-Firdaus		80	1953	Located in Kampong Lorong Buangkok, the last surviving village in Singapore.	
Surau MacAlister		100	Unknown	This surau is situated within the grounds of the Singapore General Hospital in Outram, Singapore. It is also known as Surau SGH.	
Surau Ghim Moh		100	1981	The only Singaporean surau situated under a block of flats, it is located in the Ghim Moh neighbourhood of Buona Vista.	
Musholla Khanqah Khairiyah		80	Unknown	This surau is situated within the abandoned Kubur Kassim cemetery. It serves a double purpose, serving as a place for prayers, a place for washing the deceased (when the cemetery was still active) and a zawiya. The surau is also attached to the mausoleum of Khawaja Habibullah, a Muslim scholar and mystic.	
Marina One Surau		100	Unknown	A surau situated under the eastern tower of the large Marina One complex. It is equipped with a library, as well as facilities for ablution.	

== See also ==
- Lists of mosques
- List of oldest mosques
