= Masjid Al-Taqua =

Mosque located in Tanah Merah, Singapore

Masjid Al-Taqua مسجد التقوى 大園清真寺
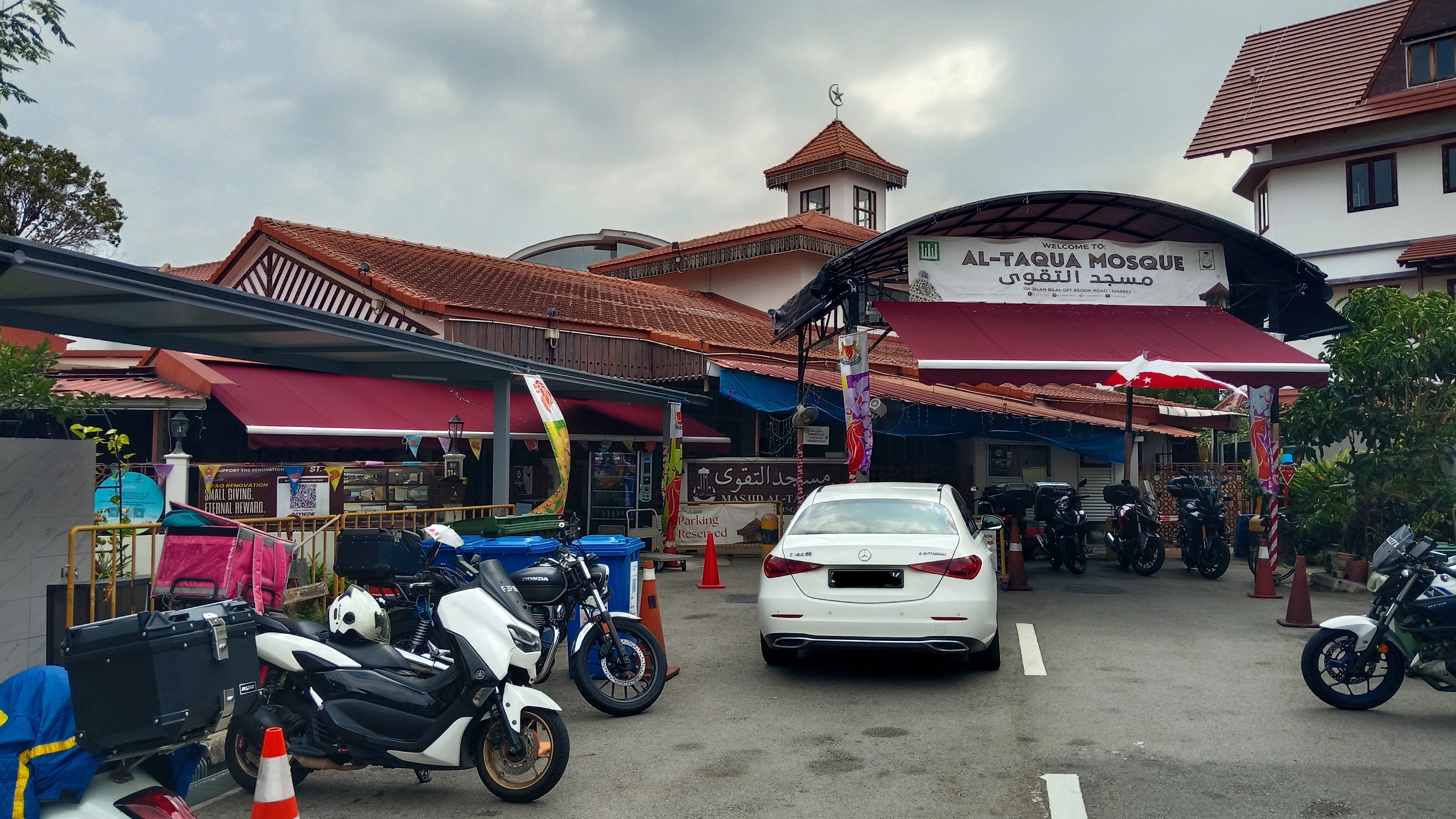
- Masjid Al-Taqua in 2026.

- Location in Singapore

Religion
- Affiliation: Sunni Islam

Location
- Location: 11A Jalan Bilal, Singapore 468862
- Country: Singapore
- Coordinates: 1.3217810°N 103.9535876°E

Architecture
- Type: Mosque
- Style: Islamic architecture
- Established: 1883
- Completed: 1964 (Original mosque); 1986 (First reconstruction); 2006 (Second reconstruction)
- Capacity: 1,000

Masjid Al-Taqua (Jawi: مسجد التقوى, Singaporean Mandarin: 大園清真寺) is a congregational mosque located on the southern coast of Bedok within Tanah Merah, Singapore. Originating as a 19th-century surau, it was later rebuilt into a mosque in the 20th century. As with all other mosques in Singapore, the mosque is managed by the Majlis Ugama Islam Singapura (MUIS).

== Etymology ==
The name of the mosque, Al-Taqua, is an Islamic term that refers to one's piety due to his consciousness of God. A group of people who practice taqwa are collectively known as the "muttaqin." The word "taqwa" and its derivatives have been mentioned in the Qur'an over two hundred and fifty times.

== History ==
The original structure at the site was a surau that was built in 1883 on a plot of land that had been endowed under a waqf scheme. The surau was later converted into a mosque and renamed Masjid Al-Taqua in 1908. The mosque was later rebuilt on 17 July 1964, with Yusof Ishak, the contemporary Yang di-Pertuan Negara of Singapore, present at its reopening ceremony. It formerly served as one of two congregational mosques in the villages of Tanah Merah (the other being Masjid Bedok Laut) that operated simultaneously until the late 1960s when a pair of Islamic missionaries from the Wahhabi sect ordered that Masjid Al-Taqua be the sole congregational mosque for the Friday prayers as having two mosques could seem like it was "dividing" the congregants. After the formation of the Islamic council, the Majlis Ugama Islam Singapura (MUIS), Masjid Al-Taqua fell under the purview of the MUIS, with full management all relegated to the newly-formed council.

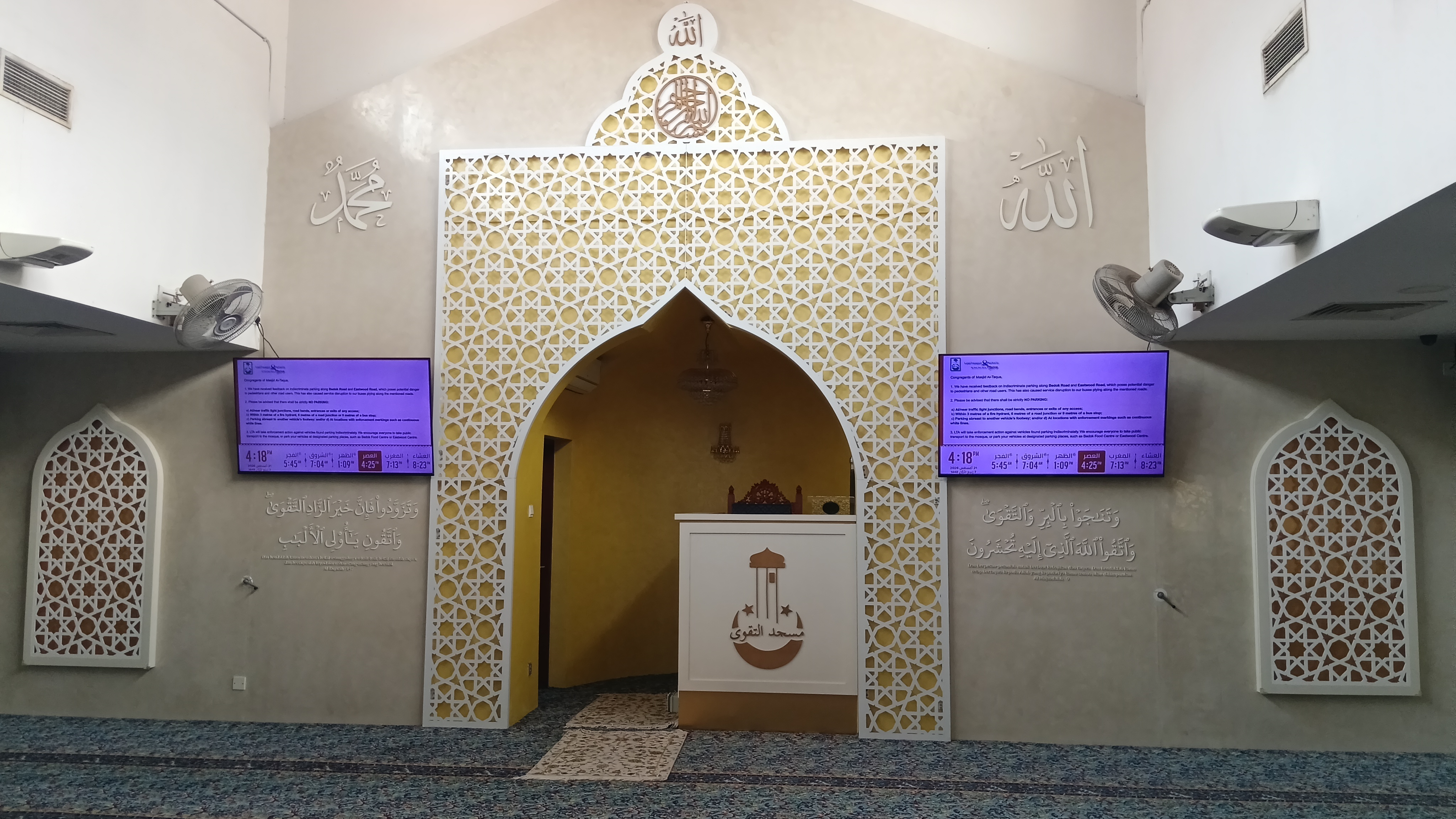
Interior of the mosque.

Then in early September 1984, the mosque was selected as the only Islamic structure to be preserved during redevelopments in the Tanah Merah area, while Masjid Bedok Laut and a neighbouring Islamic cemetery were bulldozed in order to make way for said redevelopments. The mosque later underwent an extensive renovation in late 1985 which was completed by 26 March 1986, expanding the main prayer hall and adding new sanitation facilities as well as areas for ablution. The madrasa attached to the mosque, however, remained the same while being incorporated into the structure of the new mosque. After the neighboring village houses had been razed in 1988, the Jalan Bilal road was shortened and the mosque ended up being at the end of said road.

In December 2006, the mosque was closed down to undergo an extensive reconstruction, which was completed in late August. The reconstruction increased the capacity of the main prayer hall to have a thousand worshippers, while retaining the traditional Malay styles of the former building.

== Transportation ==
Masjid Al-Taqua is situated at the end of the Jalan Bilal road which is an offshoot of Bedok Road on the southern coast of Bedok. The nearest MRT station, Tanah Merah MRT station, is located within a 1.3km distance from the mosque, while the nearest bus stop, labelled "Country Park," can be found just outside Jalan Bilal, adjacent to the mosque.

== See also ==
- Islam in Singapore
- List of mosques in Singapore
