= Masjid Haji Mohd Salleh =

Mosque located in Geylang, Singapore

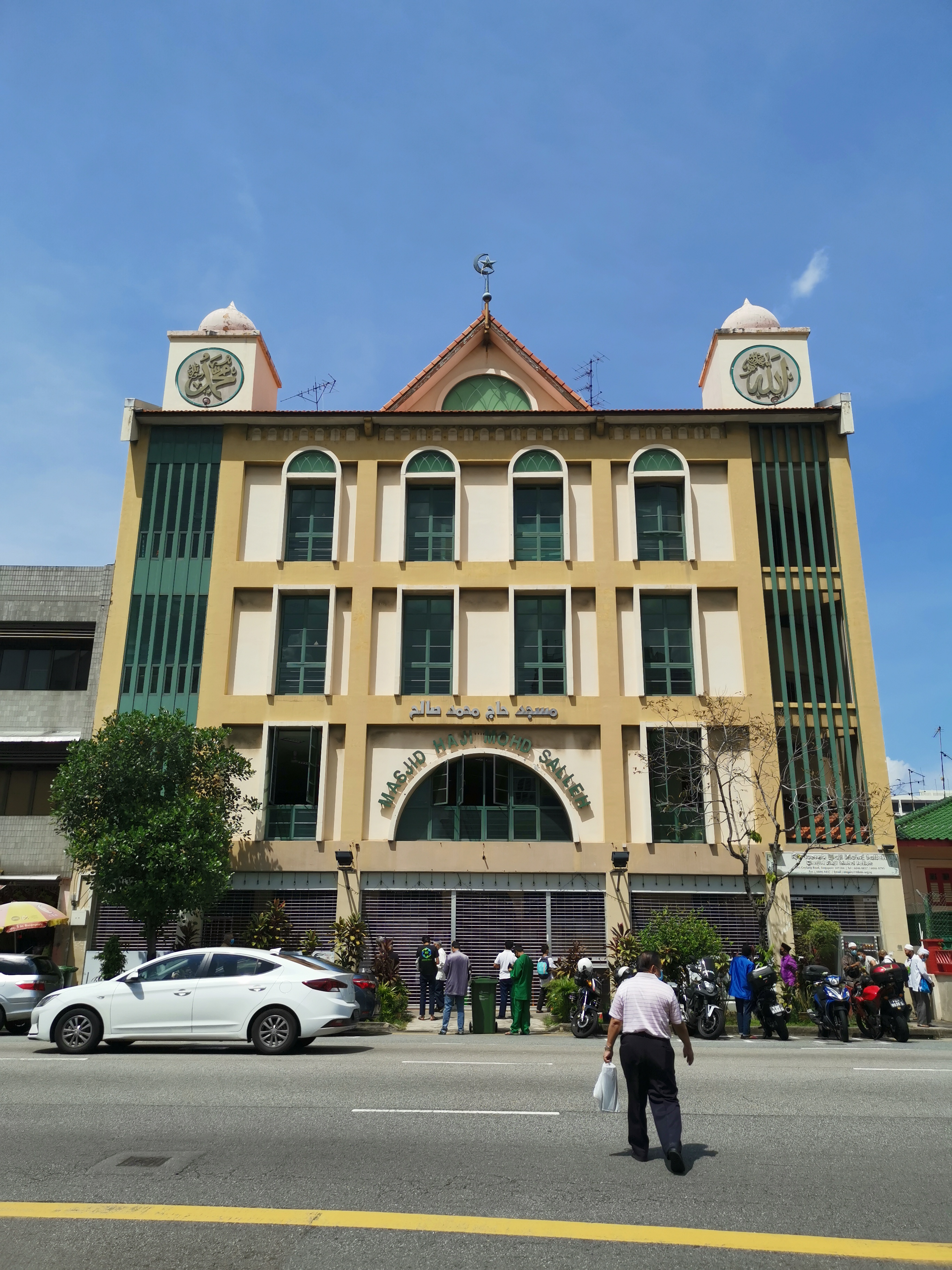
- Main facade of the mosque facing Geylang Road.

- Location in Singapore

Religion
- Affiliation: Sunni Islam

Location
- Location: 245 Geylang Road, Singapore 389304
- Country: Singapore
- Coordinates: 1.3122948°N 103.8768412°E

Architecture
- Type: Mosque
- Style: Modernist architecture
- Founder: Haji Mohamed Salleh bin Ally
- Established: 1896
- Completed: 1999

Masjid Haji Mohd Salleh is a mosque located in Geylang, Singapore. Originating in 1896, the present mosque dates back to the late 20th century. It is situated in the midst of the only red-light district in the country and is one of two mosques in the area, the other being Masjid Khadijah.

== History ==
An Indian Muslim merchant, Haji Mohamed Salleh bin Ally, founded a mosque in 1896 on a plot of land along Geylang Road, after purchasing said plot of land from fellow merchant Vena Meena Bok Abdul Kader. The family of Haji Salleh took up administration and general management of the mosque, while also maintaining the land it stood on to be under a waqf that could not be sold or reappropriated for usage other than a mosque. It mainly served Muslim merchants and colonial civil servants that were based in the Geylang area. Several keramat shrines dedicated to local Muslim nobles and sages were present near the mosque, such as a so-called Dark Keramat; all these were demolished by 1995.

During the Second World War, the mosque was heavily damaged by several air raids from Japanese air forces against Geylang Road. After the end of the war, the mosque was rebuilt in 1959 as a larger structure with a tiered roof and minaret that resembled the later Masjid Darul Aman, another mosque in Geylang. Haji Salleh's heirs continued to run the mosque until 1968 when they gave up the mosque to the newly-formed Majlis Ugama Islam Singapura (MUIS). Under the MUIS, the mosque was given approval for the collection of the Zakat tax, as well as registration for needy families. It was also allowed to host the Friday sermon in the English language.

In 1980, the number of the congregants in the mosque gradually increased, which prompted discussions to expand the mosque. The decision to rebuild the mosque was later approved in 1985 by the MUIS, which sent the committee of the mosque an advisory letter. A prototype of the mosque was completed in 1991 by architectural firm Design 2000 and presented to the public by Haron Abdul Rahman, the head chairman of the mosque's committee. Once sufficient funds had been collected, the mosque was torn down in 1998 and rebuilt from the ground up, reopening on 5 November 1999. Syed Isa Semait, then the Mufti of the country, was present at the reopening ceremony to declare the building officially open to the public.

== Architecture ==
Masjid Haji Mohd Salleh is a square, cuboid building comprising four levels, with the main prayer halls on the second and third level while administrative offices and the customer service centre are located on the ground level. The exterior of the mosque is modernist in nature, with eight rectangular windows on the upper level and two cube-shaped pillars flanking either side of the facade, a dome topping each one of them. The mosque has a maximum capacity of 2,000 worshippers as well.

== Location ==
Masjid Haji Mohd Salleh is situated at the junction of Geylang Road with Lorongs (Malay for "corners") 9 and 11. The even numbered Lorongs opposite the mosque are notorious for being parts of the only red-light district in Singapore, where moderate prostitution is legalized. Shophouses behind the mosque contain brothels and sensual massage parlours, most of which are heavily monitored by the authorities. Despite its odd location for a place of worship, the committee of the mosque ignores the stigma around its location and hosts programmes intended to bring the surrounding community away from prostitution and into the fold of the Islamic religion.

The mosque is also accessible from public transport, being located within walking distance from the Kallang MRT station and having a bus stop directly opposite it.

== See also ==
- Islam in Singapore
- List of mosques in Singapore
