= Masjid Al-Khair =

Mosque located in Choa Chu Kang, Singapore

- Jawi: مسجد الخير
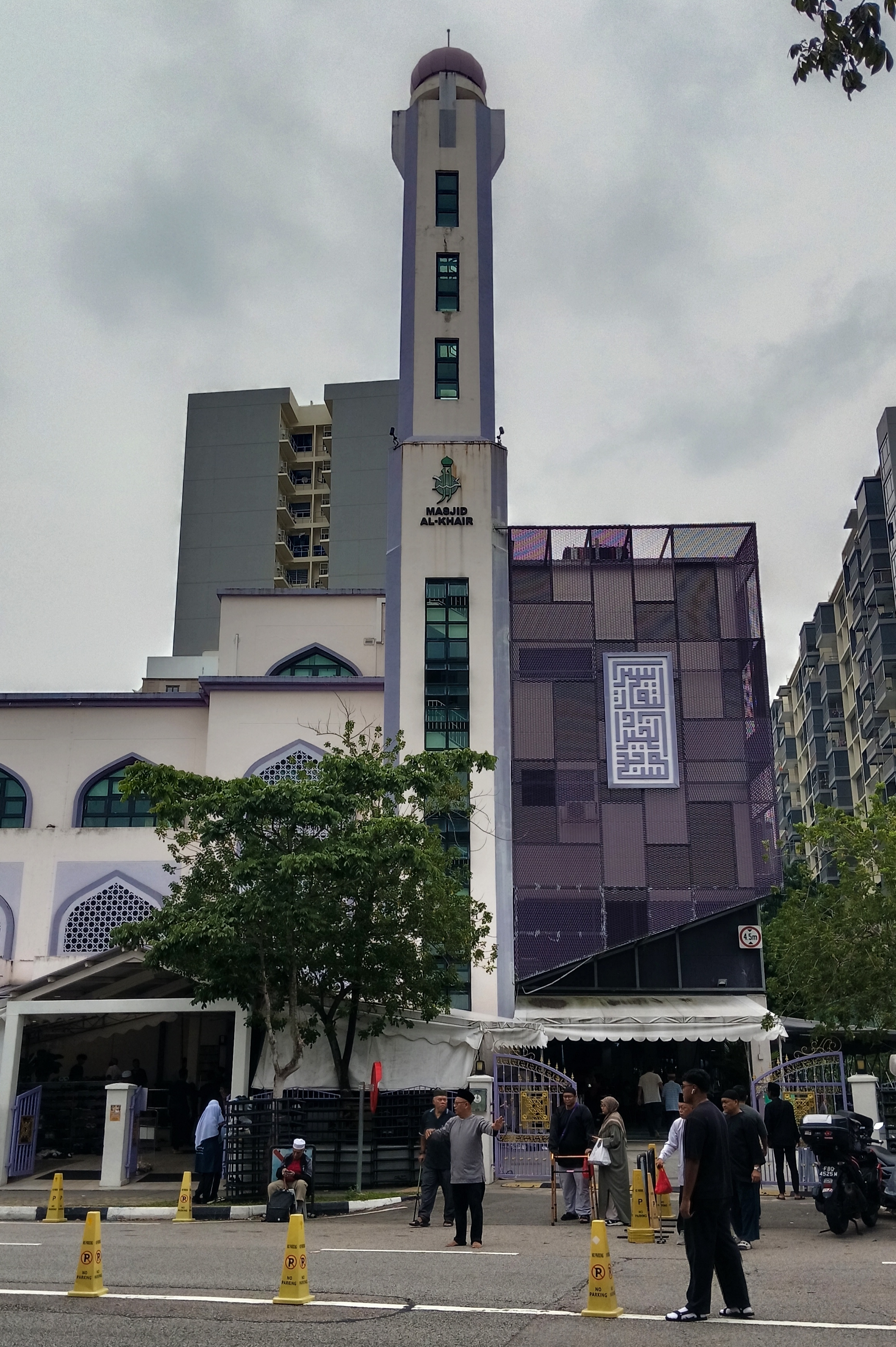
- Masjid Al-Khair as seen from Teck Whye Crescent.

- Location in Singapore

Religion
- Affiliation: Sunni Islam

Location
- Location: 1 Teck Whye Crescent, Singapore 688847
- Country: Singapore
- Coordinates: 1.3827728°N 103.7500180°E

Architecture
- Type: Mosque
- Style: Urbanist, Islamic architecture
- Established: c. 1985
- Completed: 1997; 29 years ago

Specifications
- Capacity: 4,000
- Dome: 1
- Minaret: 1

Masjid Al-Khair is a mosque located in Choa Chu Kang, Singapore. Situated within the heart of Teck Whye, it has a capacity of 4,000 worshippers. The mosque was built in 1997 as a replacement for an older mosque situated in the same neighbourhood.

== History ==
Masjid Al-Khair was established in the 1990s to replace a former mosque that stood on a hilltop along Choa Chu Kang Road. This mosque, also named Masjid Al-Khair, was a centre for communal activities, counselling, missionary work, and divorce proceedings, centred in the Teck Whye neighborhood. It held a fundraiser in late 1988 in order to gather funds for a proposed reconstruction for the accommodation of more worshippers. Then in April 1995, more details were revealed to the public about the reconstruction, which included a wider, two-storey main prayer hall, an auditorium, and a modernized architectural style. It was then revealed in May 1997 that Masjid Al-Khair would be demolished for a newer mosque in the heart of Teck Whye.

Completed in late 1997, the new mosque was built under the Mosque Building Fund, an initiative introduced by the Majlis Ugama Islam Singapura (MUIS) that would help to fund the construction of mosques nationwide. It was officially inaugurated on 31 May 1998, although it had been opened much earlier. As part of a campaign against smokers, a pair of mummified lungs were placed on display at the reception area of the mosque, as a visual art display showing the harmful effects of smoking.

In 2017, with the approval of the MUIS, the mosque received an extensive renovation, which expanded its main prayer hall and allowed for more than 4,000 worshippers to be accommodated during Jummah and festive prayers.

== Architecture ==
The overall architectural style of Masjid Al-Khair is completely modern, with themes of environmental conservation and urbanism. The walls of the mosque are made of glass to reduce the need for lights. Classrooms in the mosque can also be easily converted into spaces for prayers.

== Transportation ==
Masjid Al-Khair is situated in the heart of the Teck Whye neighbourhood and is within walking distance of the Keat Hong LRT station on the Bukit Panjang LRT line.

== See also ==
- Islam in Singapore
- List of mosques in Singapore
