= Masjid En-Naeem =

Mosque in Singapore

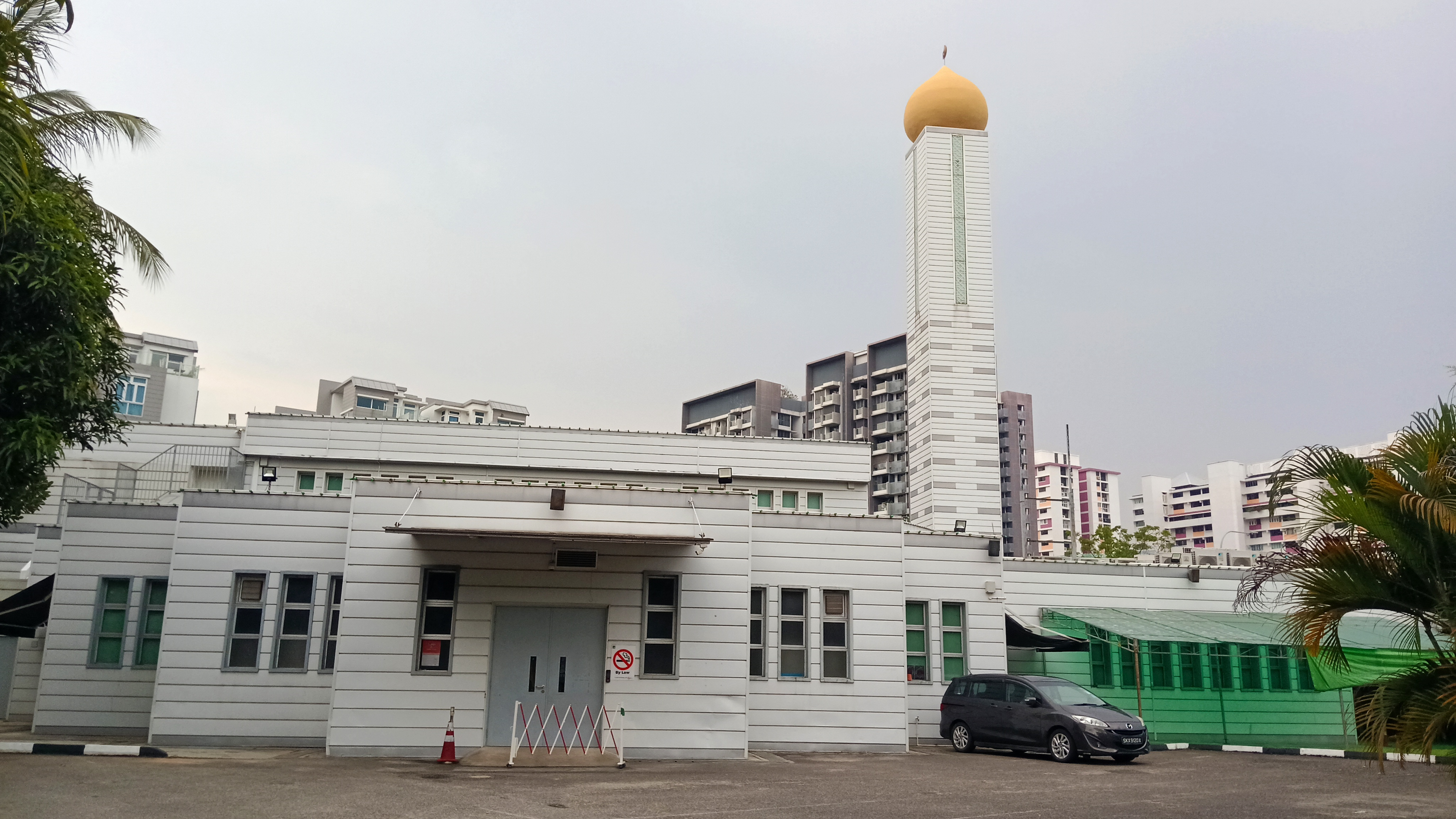

- Location in Singapore

Religion
- Affiliation: Sunni Islam

Location
- Location: 120 Tampines Rd, Singapore 535136
- Country: Singapore
- Interactive map of Masjid En-Naeem
- Coordinates: 1°21′39.8″N 103°53′32.2″E

Architecture
- Completed: 1983
- Capacity: 2,500

Website
- https://www.ennaeem.sg/

Masjid En-Naeem (Jawi: مسجد النعيم) or the En-Naeem Mosque is located in Hougang, Singapore. Established in the 1980s, it was completed and first opened in 1983. The mosque mainly serves the residents of the Hougang neighbourhood.

== History ==
Masjid En-Naeem was established in the 1980s, with fundraising for its construction starting in 1981. Intended to serve the Muslims living in the Hougang neighbourhood, the mosque was part of the second phase of the Mosque Building Fund, an initiative introduced by the Majlis Ugama Islam Singapura in the 1970s. Construction started in April 1982. It was completed in 1983 with the official opening of the mosque on 27 September of that same year. In 1985, the mosque launched a series of madrasa classes for both children and adults. The mosque underwent a renovation in 2006 which helped to increase its capacity.

In 2019, the mosque launched a program to help ex-convicts and former offenders reintegrate into society. In 2022, the funeral prayer for former journalist Rhazaly Noentil was held at Masjid En-Naeem.

== Incidents ==
On 3 September 1995, a stationwagon crashed into the main entrance of Masjid En-Naeem after a Mawlid celebration. The vehicle was parked at the kerb within the mosque compound and suddenly rammed into the building's main doors upon starting up its engine. At least 5 people were injured, but only 2 people were hospitalized while the rest were given outpatient treatment at the mosque. The driver of the vehicle was arrested for reckless driving but was released on 6 September on bail.

== See also ==
- List of mosques in Singapore
