= Masjid Al-Iman =

Mosque in Bukit Panjang, Singapore

- مسجد الإيمان
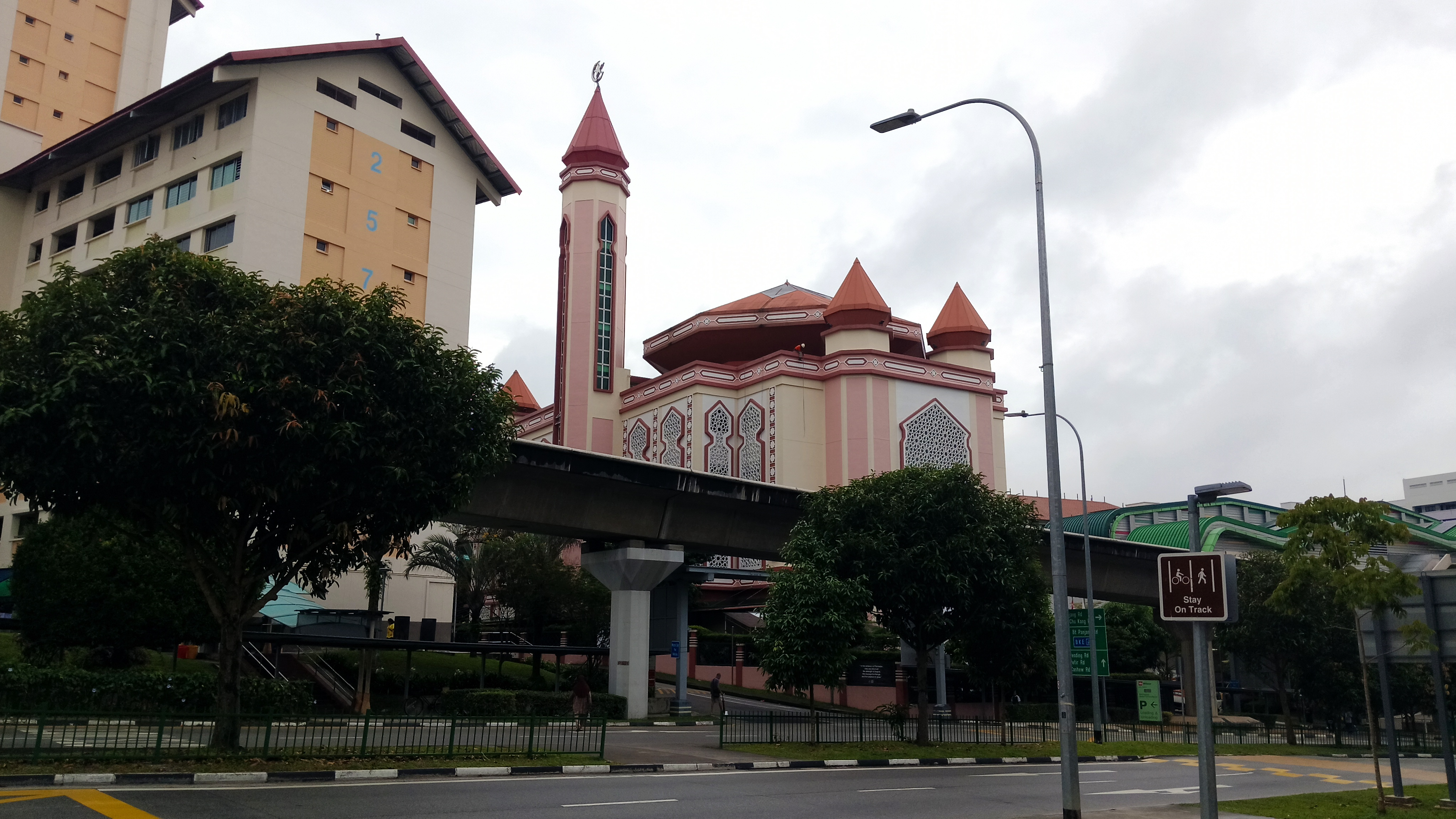

- Location in Singapore

Religion
- Affiliation: Sunni Islam

Location
- Location: 10 Bukit Panjang Ring Rd, Singapore 679943
- Country: Singapore
- Coordinates: 1.3780917°N 103.7724835°E

Architecture
- Type: mosque
- Established: 1975
- Completed: 1995

Specifications
- Capacity: 5,000
- Minaret: 1

Masjid Al-Iman (Jawi: مسجد الإيمان; Mosque of the Faith) is a mosque located in Bukit Panjang within the West Region, Singapore. It was first opened on 2 May 2003 and then officiated by the Minister-in-Charge of Muslim Affairs, Yaacob Ibrahim, on 19 September 2004.

== Etymology ==
The name of the mosque, Al-Iman, is derived from the Arabic word iman (إِيمَان, ʾīmān) pronounced [ʔiːˈmæːn]. The word Iman is translated as Faith, hence Al-Iman will mean The Faith.

== History ==
Masjid Al-Iman was established in 1998 under the third phase of the Mosque Building Fund scheme by the Majlis Ugama Islam Singapura (MUIS). It was the first mosque to be built in the Bukit Panjang neighbourhood. Construction on the mosque officially started in September 2000. The mosque was completed in 2003 and opened on 2 May of that same year. It was then officiated by the Minister-in-Charge of Muslim Affairs, Yaacob Ibrahim, into the MUIS' official mosque list.

== See also ==
- Islam in Singapore
- List of mosques in Singapore
