= Masjid Al-Mawaddah =

Mosque located in Sengkang, Singapore

- Jawi: مسجد المودة
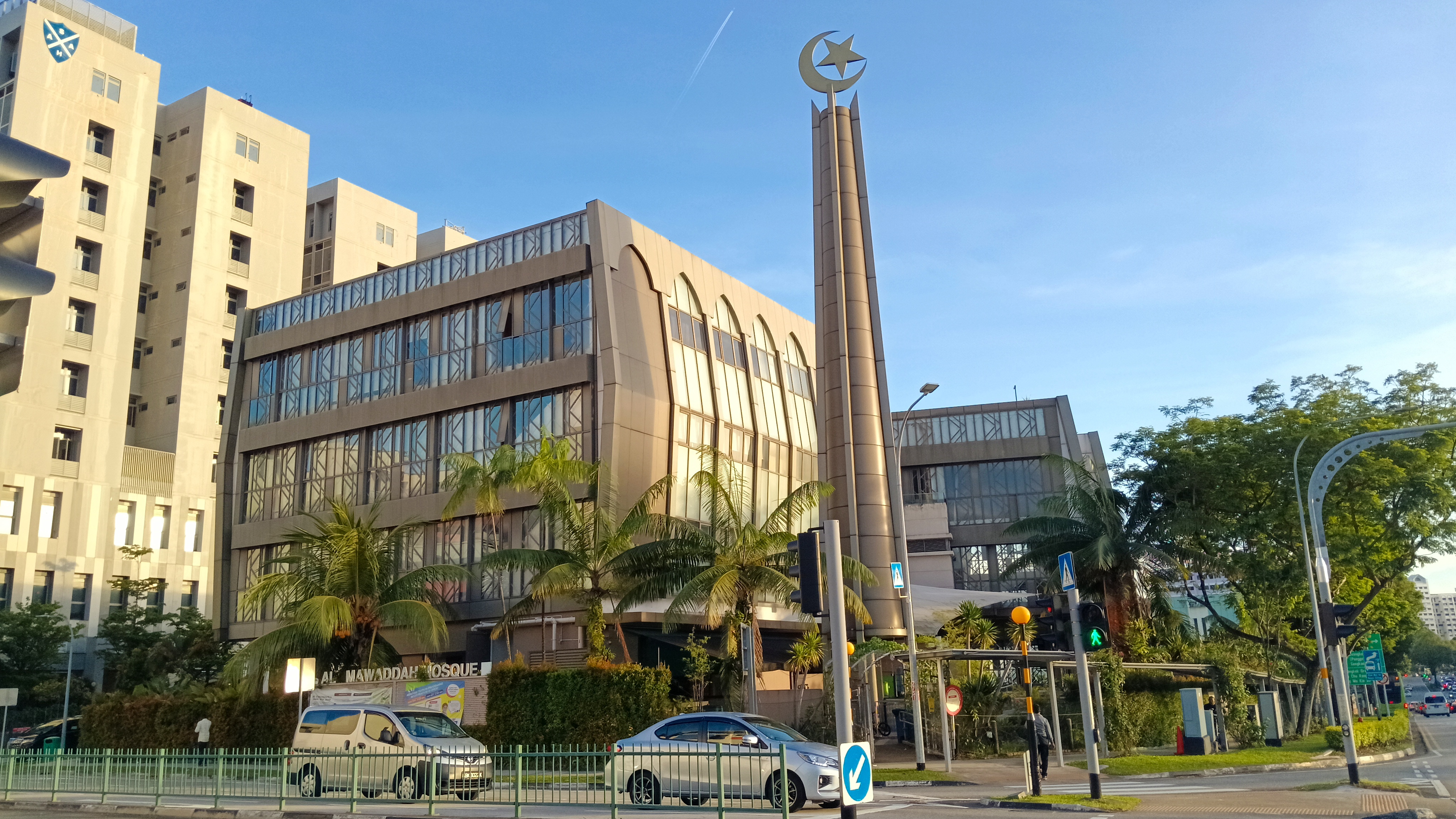
- As seen from the intersection between Sengkang East Road and Compassvale Bow.

- Location in Singapore

Religion
- Affiliation: Sunni Islam

Location
- Location: 151 Compassvale Bow, Singapore 544997
- Country: Singapore
- Coordinates: 1.28967°N 103.85007°E

Architecture
- Completed: 10 March 2009; 17 years ago
- Capacity: 4,000

Masjid Al-Mawaddah (Jawi: مسجد المودة; Al-Mawaddah Mosque) is a mosque located in Buangkok, within the Sengkang planning area of the North-East Region, Singapore. It is adjacent to Renjong LRT station and the Sengkang Grand Mall.

== History ==
Plans for a new family-oriented mosque in the Sengkang neighbourhood were finalized in 2007. The construction of the mosque, named Masjid Al-Mawaddah, was completed by 10 March 2009. The mosque was then opened in May of the same year. It was considered to be the first mosque in Singapore built with an eco-friendly design. The mosque celebrated its special opening year anniversary a year later on 21 May 2010.

In 2009 and 2015, the mosque held a korban event as part of the Eid al-Adha celebration.

== Architecture ==
Due to being built in a modern architectural style, the mosque's appearance deviates from a traditional local Islamic architectural style, lacking a dome and a fenced courtyard. It has several environmentally-conscious features which include a garden rooftop and natural solar-based skylights to illuminate the building.

== Incidents ==
=== October 2017 ===
On 13 October 2017, the Berita Harian newspaper published an article titled How to Deal with Stubborn Wives (translated title) by Ustadh Mohammed Zaid Ishak, the executive Imam of Masjid Al-Mawaddah. In the article, the Ustadh responded to a question asking how one should deal with a stubborn wife; his response was that it was permissible to hit a stubborn wife as a last resort if distancing oneself from her did not work out. He added that the beating should not leave any visible marks on her body and should not be done on the face. His view was similar to the view of Hanafi scholars on the matter of wife-beating, for example the view of Abu al-Barakat al-Nasafi who cited a similar ruling in his book, Kanz ad-Daqa'iq.

The response of the Ustadh was met with uproar and massive controversy on social media platforms. The incident prompted an immediate response from Nee Soon Group Representation Constituency's Member of Parliament, Faishal Ibrahim, and head of the Office of the Mufti, Irwan Hadi, denouncing spousal violence of any form. Mohammed Zaid Ishak later clarified that the ruling he had introduced was not meant as an excuse for a husband to beat his wife, adding that it was a classical Islamic ruling and one should look in a modern context regarding similar matters.

=== January 2020 ===
On 19 January 2020, a man named Fadhil Yusop entered the mosque with a knife and threatened a religious teacher who was holding a large class of students. Beforehand, Yusop had attacked a jogger, slashing his forearm, and attempted an attack on another man whom managed to escape. Yusop, who was under the influence of drugs, was apprehended by the police after he was subdued at the mosque, receiving a sentence of nine months and two weeks jail.

== Accessibility ==
The mosque is located near to Buangkok MRT station and Renjong LRT station. It is also within walking distance from the Sengkang Grand Mall.

== See also ==
- List of mosques in Singapore
