= Masjid Darussalam (Singapore) =

Mosque in Clementi, Singapore

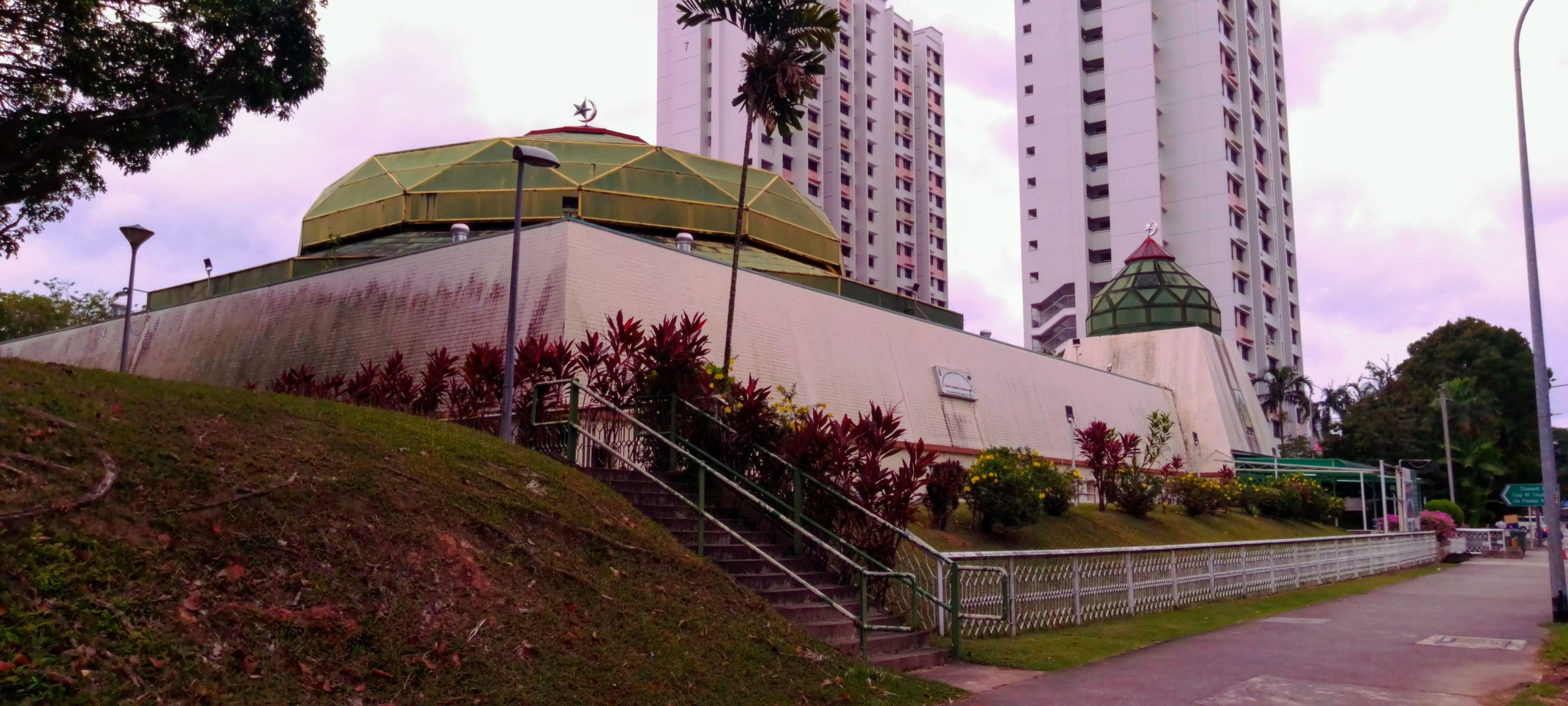
- Main facade of Masjid Darussalam.

- Location in Singapore

Religion
- Affiliation: Sunni Islam

Location
- Location: 3002 Commonwealth Ave W, Singapore 129579
- Country: Singapore
- Interactive map of Masjid Darussalam
- Coordinates: 1.3123776°N 103.7711320°E

Architecture
- Type: Mosque
- Style: Modern architecture, with elements of traditional Islamic architecture and ancient Egyptian architecture
- Established: 1984
- Completed: 1988

Masjid Darussalam (Jawi: مسجد دار السلام) is a mosque located in Clementi, Singapore. Completed in late 1988, it is situated in close proximity to the Clementi MRT station.

== History ==
Before the 1980s, the Tentera Diraja Mosque was the only mosque in the Clementi neighbourhood, built in 1962 by Muslim soldiers of the colonial army and later transferred to rented land ownership after the British had left. The rural and steep location of the mosque proved inconvenient for the Muslim residents of Clementi, along with the fact that the mosque had a capacity of four hundred worshippers. Plans for a new mosque in the heart of Clementi were considered in the late 1970s and officially confirmed in May 1981 by Yusoff Samadi, chairman of the newly-formed committee of the proposed mosque. By late June of the same year, the proposed mosque was officially named Masjid Darussalam.

Sales of festive greeting cards, local dishes, and pastries were made to raise funds for the construction of the mosque. The spot where the mosque would be constructed, a plot of land at the junction of Commonwealth West Avenue and Clementi Road, was revealed to the public in late 1984. The arrival of a new mosque sparked a discussion whether the old Tentera Diraja Mosque would be retained after the Darussalam Mosque had been completed, with suggestions to turn the former into a madrasa and kindergarten. Abbas Abu Amin, the Member of Parliament for Pasir Panjang, laid the foundation stone for the construction of the mosque in 1985. The mosque committee also received $3,000 in donations from Surau Kampong Pachitan, a surau in Kembangan that was set to be demolished to make way for redevelopments in the East Region.

Construction on the mosque was completed by 21 December 1988, although the mosque still remained closed for the time being. It was officially opened six days later, on 27 December. The official inauguration ceremony for the mosque was held on 19 March 1989 attended by several Muslim government officials including Abbas Abu Amin, who gave a speech at the event. The earlier Tentera Diraja Mosque, on the other hand, continued to function simultaneously alongside the Darussalam Mosque and was not demolished.

In July 2025, an extensive renovation and upgrading project was announced for the Darussalam Mosque, which would aim at expanding the main prayer hall and the addition of a two-storey atrium.

== Architecture ==
The mosque is built in a very modern architectural style that is inspired by ancient Egyptian architecture, while retaining classical Islamic elements such as domes and iwan portals. A geometric dome on an octagonal base tops the main prayer hall, which itself is octagonal in layout and can fit three thousand worshippers in all three of its levels. A smaller geometric dome on a circular base stands atop the main entrance of the mosque as well. The upper levels of the mosque outside the prayer hall serve as a madrasa. Ancillary facilities include toilets, ablution areas, administrative office rooms as well as an auditorium. The overall mosque has a green theme, which comprises both its predominately green coloured domes and interior, as well as its eco-friendly features.

== Transportation ==
Masjid Darussalam is within walking distance from the Clementi MRT station. There is also a bus stop directly outside the mosque.

== See also ==
- List of mosques in Singapore
