= Masjid Mydin =

Mosque located in Kembangan, Singapore

- Jawi: مسجد ميدين
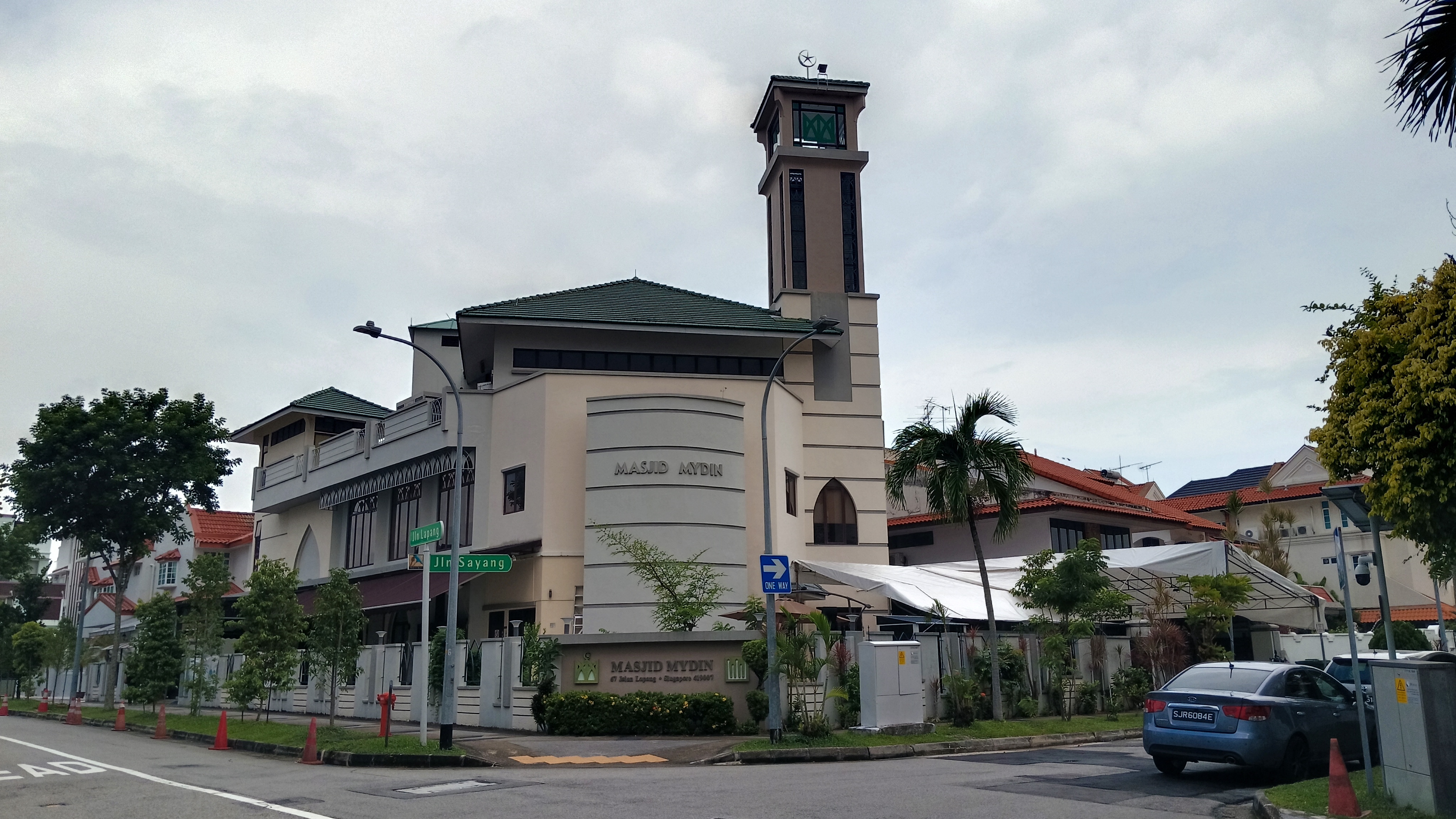

- Location in Singapore

Religion
- Affiliation: Sunni Islam

Location
- Location: 67 Jln Lapang, Singapore 419007
- Country: Singapore
- Interactive map of Masjid Mydin
- Coordinates: 1.3225998°N 103.9150751°E

Architecture
- Type: Mosque
- Style: Modern, Malay architecture
- Established: 1935
- Completed: 1935 (original structure); 2001 (current building)

Masjid Mydin is a mosque located in Kembangan, Singapore. Originally established in 1935, the mosque is named after its founder, Ena Mohydin Ebrahim. It is situated at the junction of Jalan Lapang and Jalan Sayang, within Kembangan Estate.

== Etymology ==
The name "Mydin" is derived from "Mohydin," the second name of the founder of the mosque.

== History ==
The original structure at the site was a pair of village houses in the Kampong Kembangan village that were owned by an Indian Muslim merchant, Ena Mohydin Ebrahim. In 1935, Ebrahim released both houses under an awqāf endowment, with one of them being converted into a surau and the other being converted into a madrasa. Air-conditioning systems were installed in the main prayer hall of the mosque in 1987. Kampong Kembangan was eventually cleared by 1990 to make way for the modernized landed houses of Kembangan Estate, while the mosque was one of the few buildings remaining that were preserved. Then in 1995, the mosque was selected for a reconstruction project alongside several other mosques, which included Masjid Wak Tanjong and Masjid Kassim. At least $2 million out of the total funds for the projects were given to Masjid Mydin.

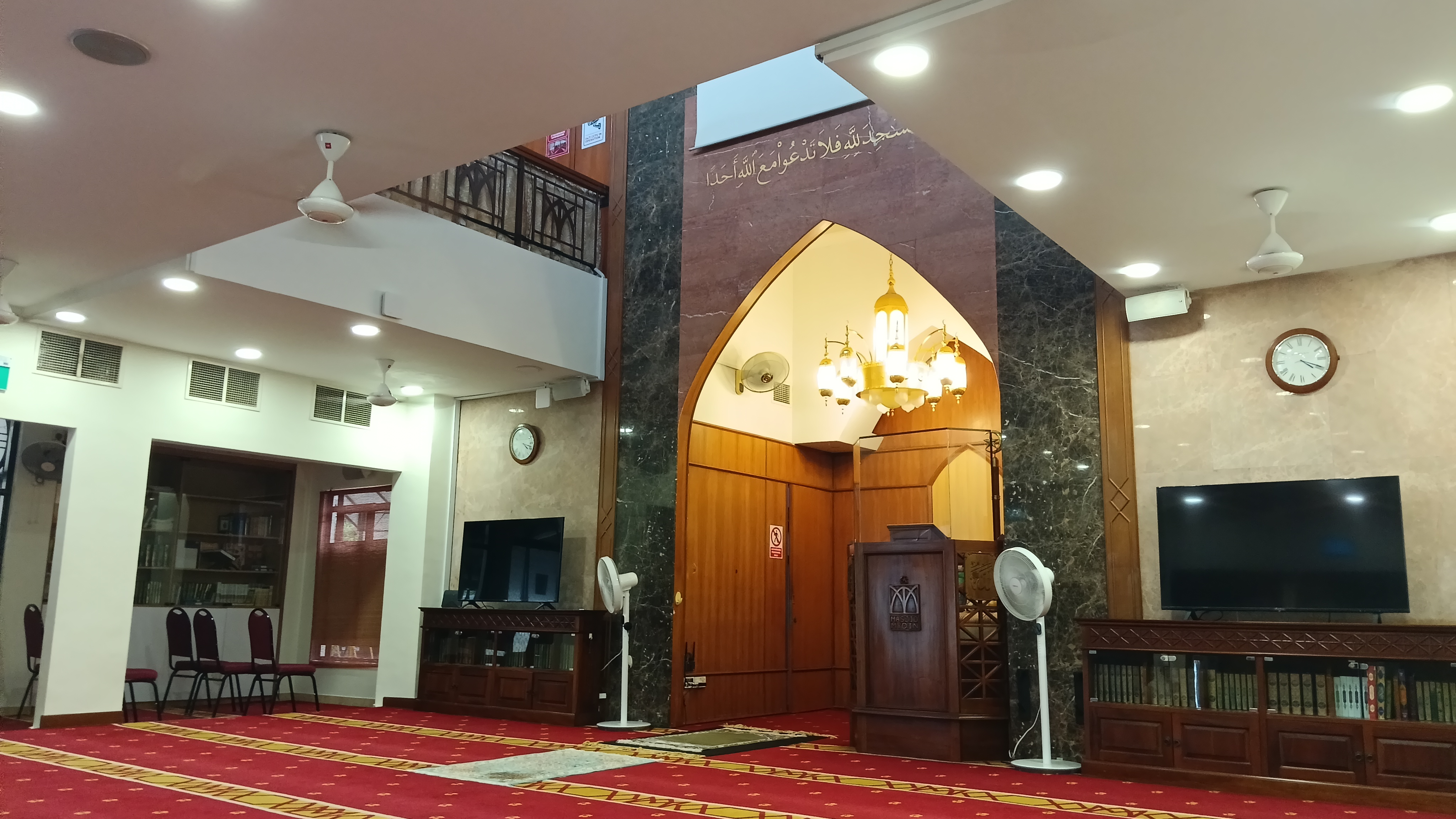
The prayer hall of Masjid Mydin during the Asr prayer time.

The mosque was reopened by the Mufti of Singapore, Syed Isa Semait, on 13 April 2001 after it had been fully reconstructed. The capacity of the mosque had also been increased to 1,000 worshippers.

== Architecture ==
Masjid Mydin is built in a modernized architectural style, intended to blend in with the other terraced houses in Kembangan Estate. A pyramidal roof tops the main prayer hall of the mosque, while plush carpeting adorns the flooring of the main prayer hall, lift lobby, and annexe. The second level is a space for female worshippers, although it is opened to male worshippers during Friday prayers. The mosque also has a single minaret with a rectangular base.

== Transportation ==
The mosque is within walking distance of the Kembangan MRT station situated on the East–West line.

== See also ==
- Masjid Kassim
- Islam in Singapore
- List of mosques in Singapore
