= Masjid Kassim =

Mosque along Changi Road in Kembangan, Singapore

- Jawi: مسجد قاسم
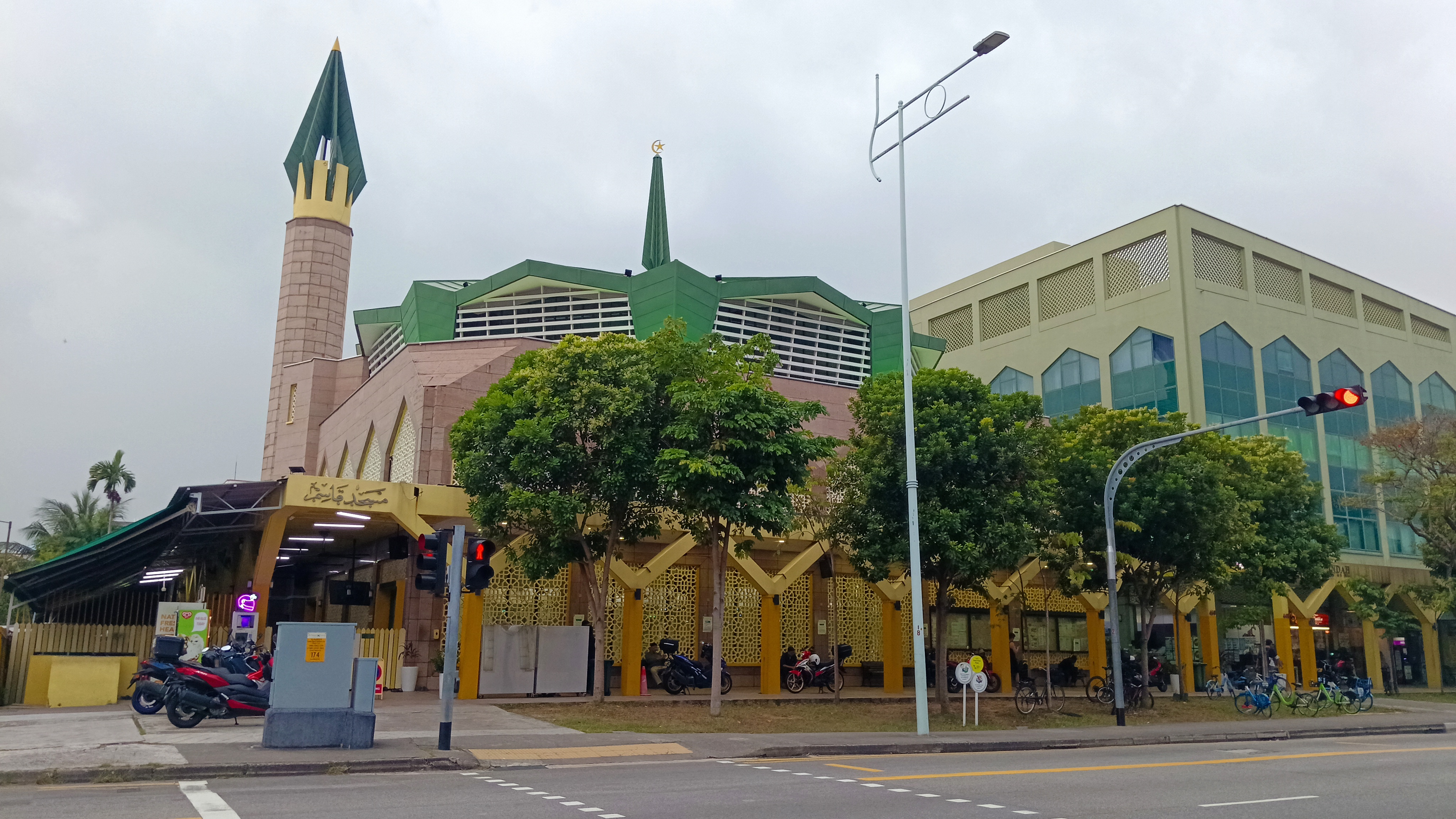

- Location in Singapore

Religion
- Affiliation: Sunni Islam

Location
- Location: 450 Changi Road, Singapore 419877
- Country: Singapore
- Interactive map of Masjid Kassim
- Coordinates: 1.3189221°N 103.9122453°E

Architecture
- Type: Mosque
- Style: Modern and Ottoman architecture
- Founder: Ahna Mohamed Kassim
- Established: 1900s
- Completed: 1921 (original structure); 1999 (current building)
- Minaret: 1

Masjid Kassim (Jawi: مسجد قاسم; literally Masjid Kāssim) is a mosque located in Kembangan, Singapore. It is named for Ahna Mohamed Kassim, who donated a plot of land along Changi Road as awqāf to build the mosque in 1921. The present-day mosque is a 1990s reconstruction and is attached to the Wisma Indah, a commercial hub.

== History ==
The original mosque was built in 1921 on land donated by an Indian Muslim merchant named Ahna Mohamed Kassim. In the same year, he later donated another portion of his land at Siglap to establish a cemetery there, which became known as Kubur Kassim. When Kassim died in 1935, the management of the lands were transferred to his heirs, until after 1965 when the lands were acquired by the government and the ownership of the mosque land given to the Majlis Ugama Islam Singapura (MUIS). Discussions to urbanize the plot of land, which included reconstructing the mosque, took place in 1986. It was finally decided in 1991 to completely rebuild the mosque from the ground up. A year later, $25,000,000 was donated to the mosque committee to fund the reconstruction, while authorities confirmed that a new commercial complex would be adjoined to the rebuilt mosque. The mosque was then torn down in May 1996, leaving only its qibla wall to indicate the direction of its facade during the rebuilding process.

By 1998, most of the mosque had been completed, with an estimated reopening date of December. However, the reconstruction was delayed slightly after the main contractor was removed from the project due to financial difficulties. The mosque was ultimately reopened on 23 July 1999 along with its adjoining commercial complex.

The mosque was affected by the COVID-19 pandemic in Singapore in 2020, and was closed down in March after two Singaporeans who visited the mosque had contracted the virus. Masjid Kassim resumed operations after the pandemic had ended. In 2025, the mosque served as a temporary shelter for homeless people, along with Masjid Al-Ansar at Chai Chee, Masjid Hang Jebat at Queenstown and Masjid Assyakirin at Boon Lay.

== Architecture ==
Masjid Kassim is built in a modern, urban architectural style that is inspired by Ottoman architecture from Turkey. The mosque has a geometric roof with a pyramidal top that mimics a dome, while it also has a singular minaret that is topped with a ten-pronged star. The exterior of the mosque has a grille design at street level, over the windows that lead into the main prayer hall of the mosque. The interior of the mosque has three levels to accommodate an approximate number of 2,000 worshippers. The ablution areas for male worshippers are located on the ground level and can be seen by people passing by, while the female ablution areas are located on the second level with the aim of being as hidden as possible for privacy. Architects who worked on the Sultan Salahuddin Abdul Aziz Mosque assisted with designing the mosque. Granite and sandstone were used to make the majority of the structure.

The Wisma Indah commercial building that is adjoined to the mosque has a shopping centre on the bottom level as well as a madrasah on the upper levels. The building is square in shape when viewed from above, with seven niches for windows on each side. Minister for Community Development and Minister-in-charge of Muslim Affairs Abdullah Tarmugi gave a speech at the entrance of the Wisma Indah building upon its opening in 1999.

== Gallery ==
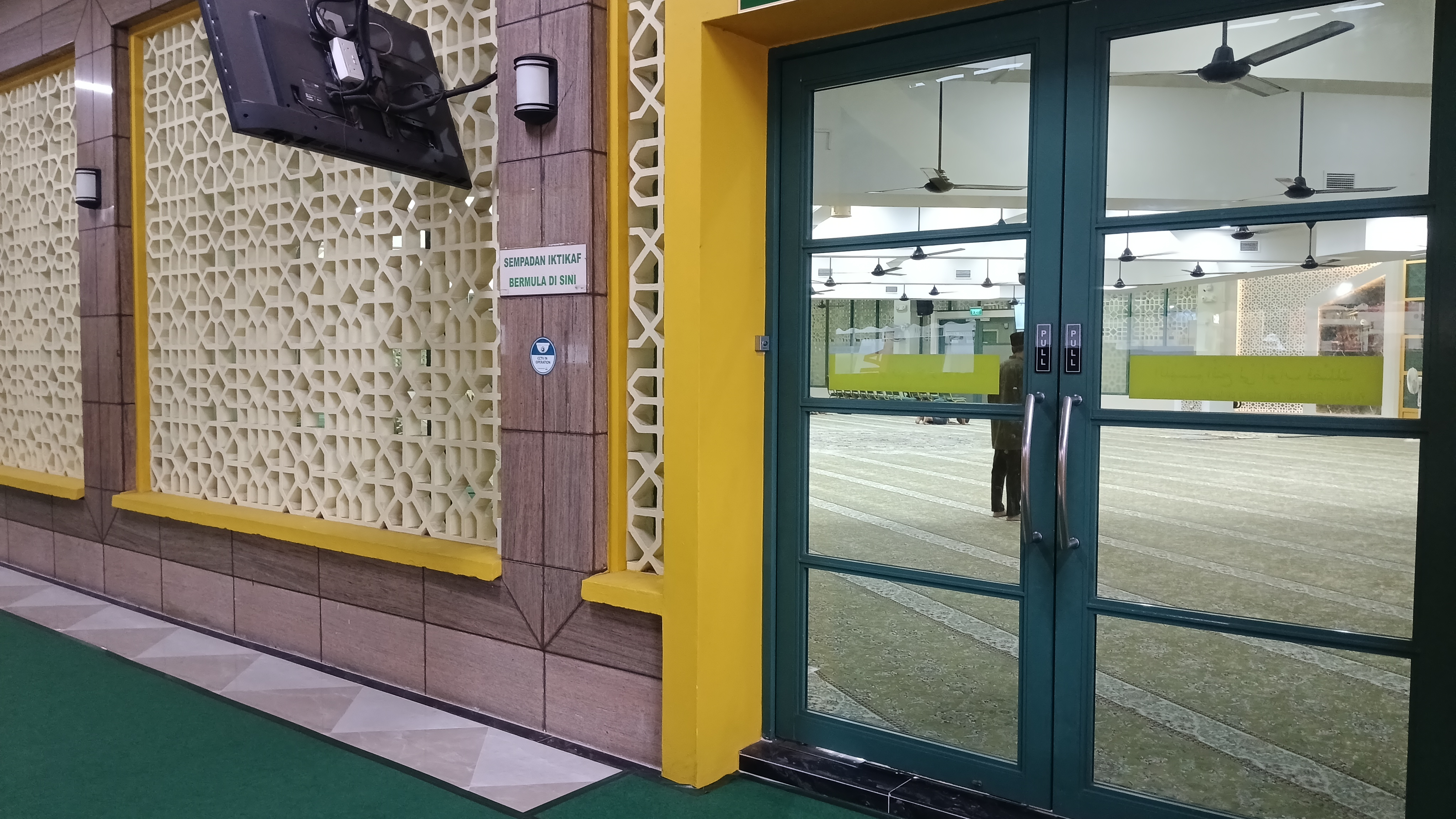
Outside the main prayer hall of the mosque.

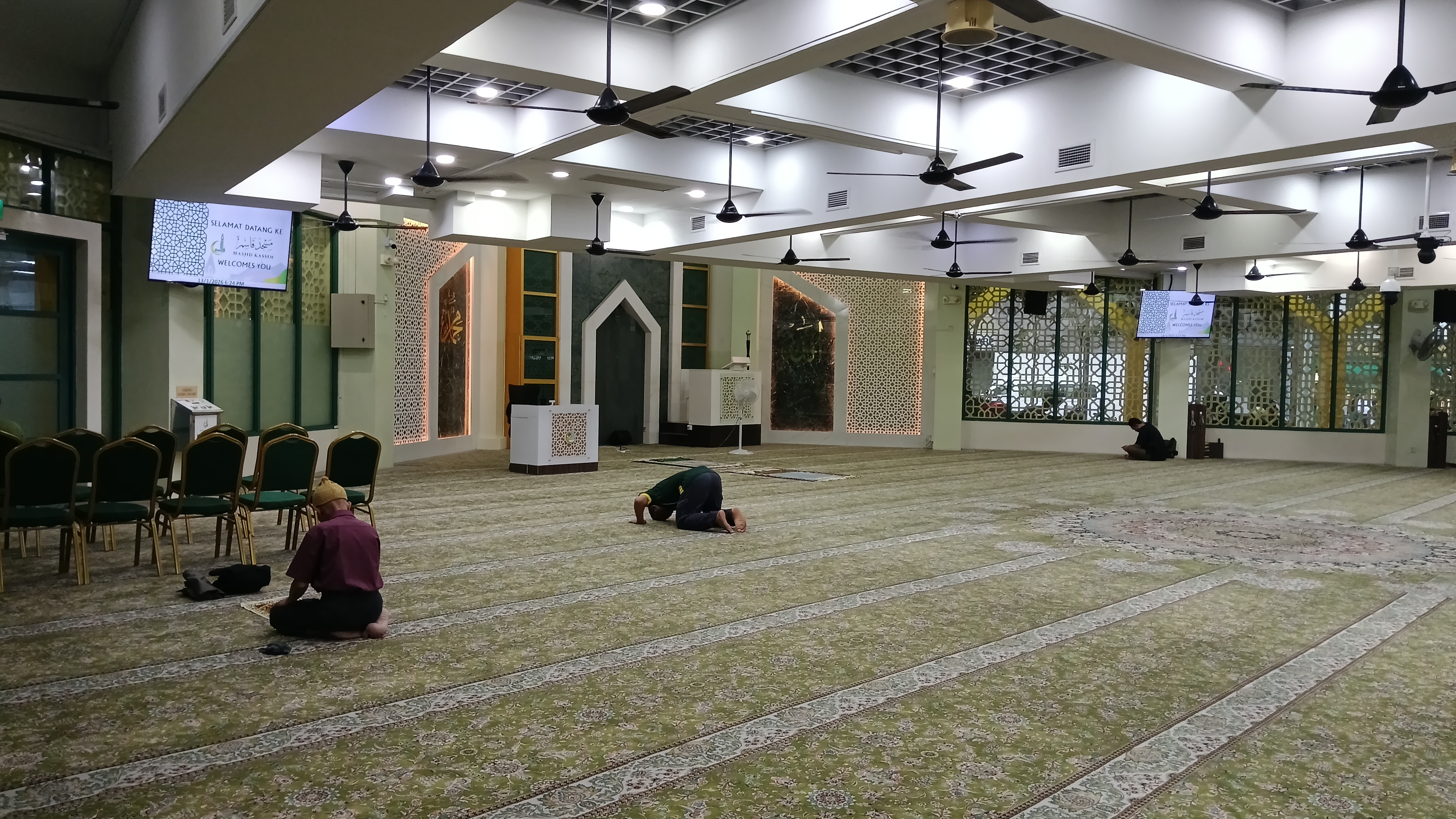
An inside view of the main prayer hall of the mosque.

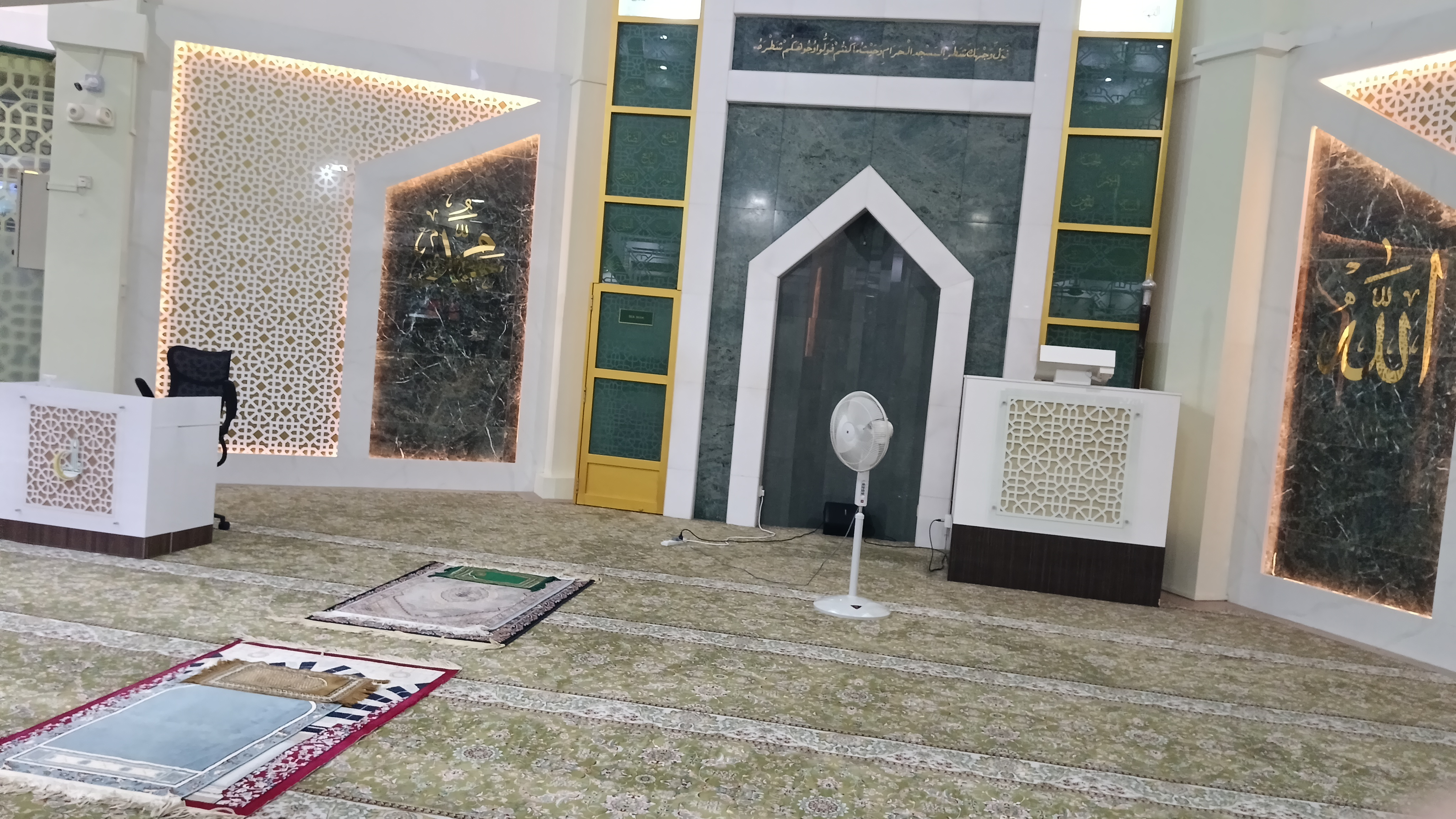
The qibla of the mosque, with mihrab and minbar (pulpit) in view.

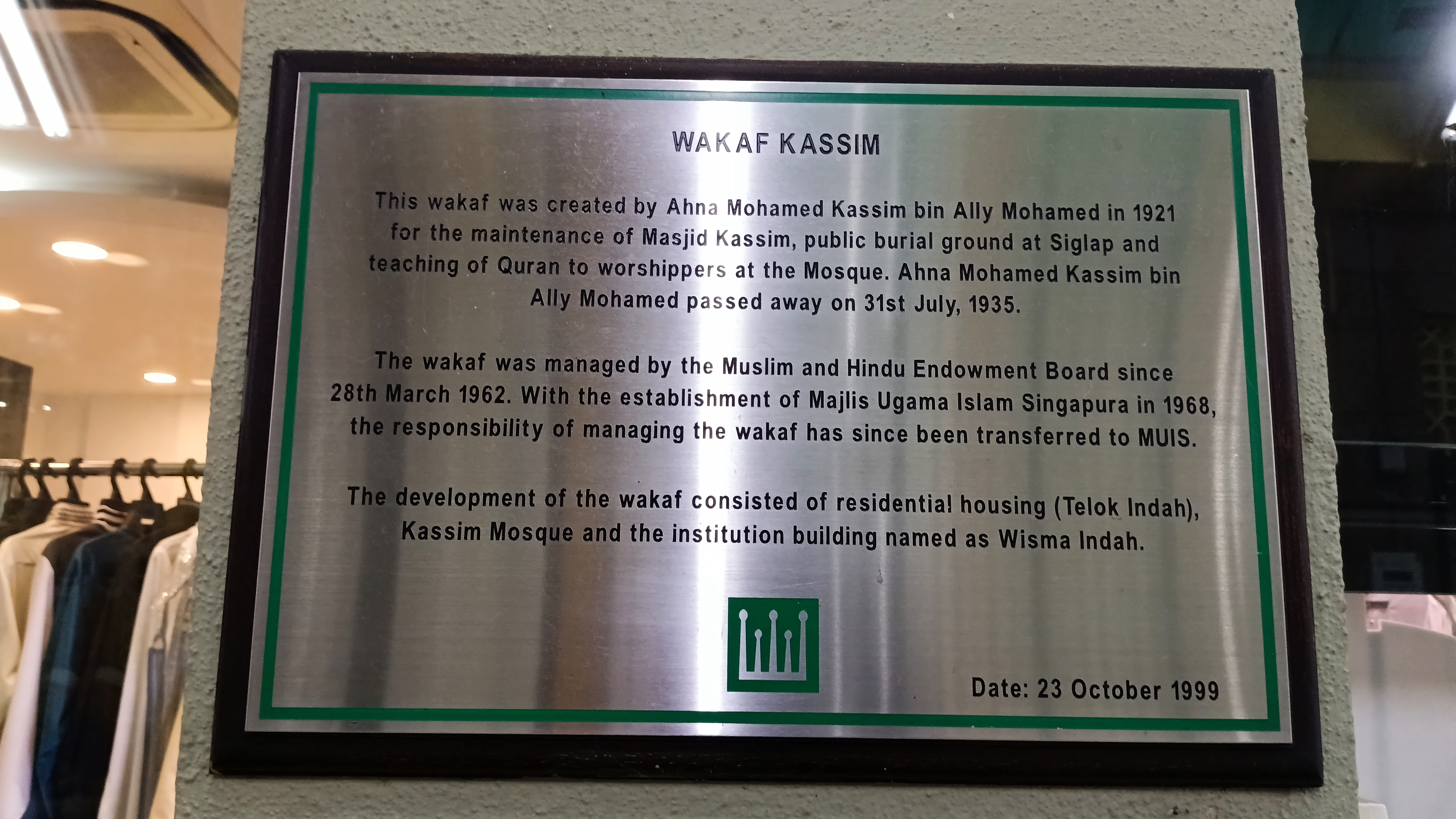
A plaque displayed by the MUIS which commemorates the contributions of Ahna Mohamed Kassim.

== Transportation ==
Masjid Kassim is within walking distance from the Kembangan MRT station, which is situated on the East–West MRT line. It also has its own dedicated bus stop, which is served by bus services 2, 7, 24, 25, 26, 28 and 30. The Siglap Park Connector runs beside the mosque, connecting it to the Telok Kurau, Marine Parade and Siglap neighbourhoods.

== See also ==
- Kubur Kassim
- List of mosques in Singapore
