= Chulia Street =

Road in Singapore

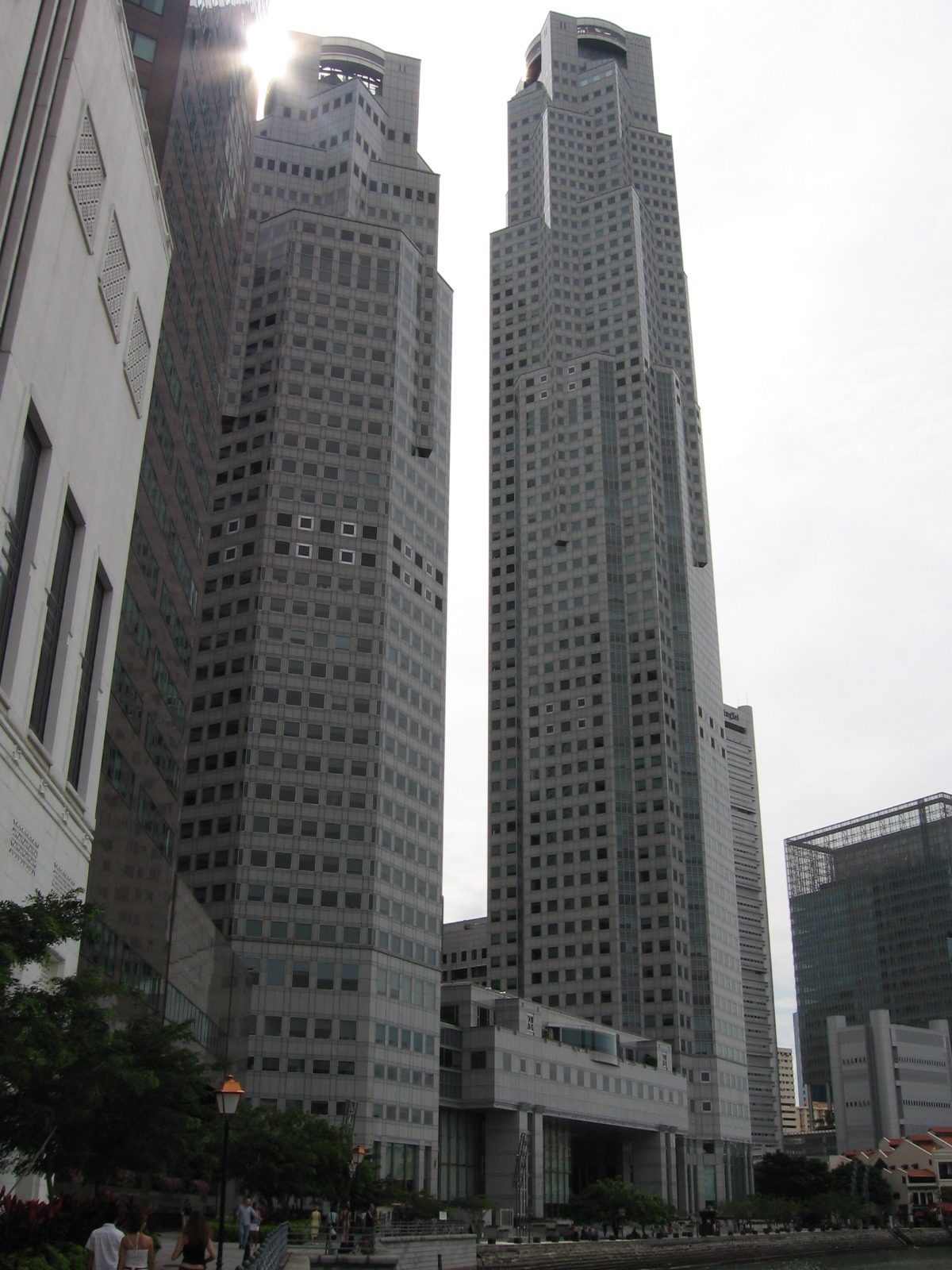
- The UOB Plaza Towers as seen from Chulia Street.
- Owner: Land Transport Authority (LTA); Urban Redevelopment Authority (URA)
- Maintained by: LTA
- Nearest Mass Rapid Transit System station: Raffles Place MRT station

Other
- Known for: UOB Plaza

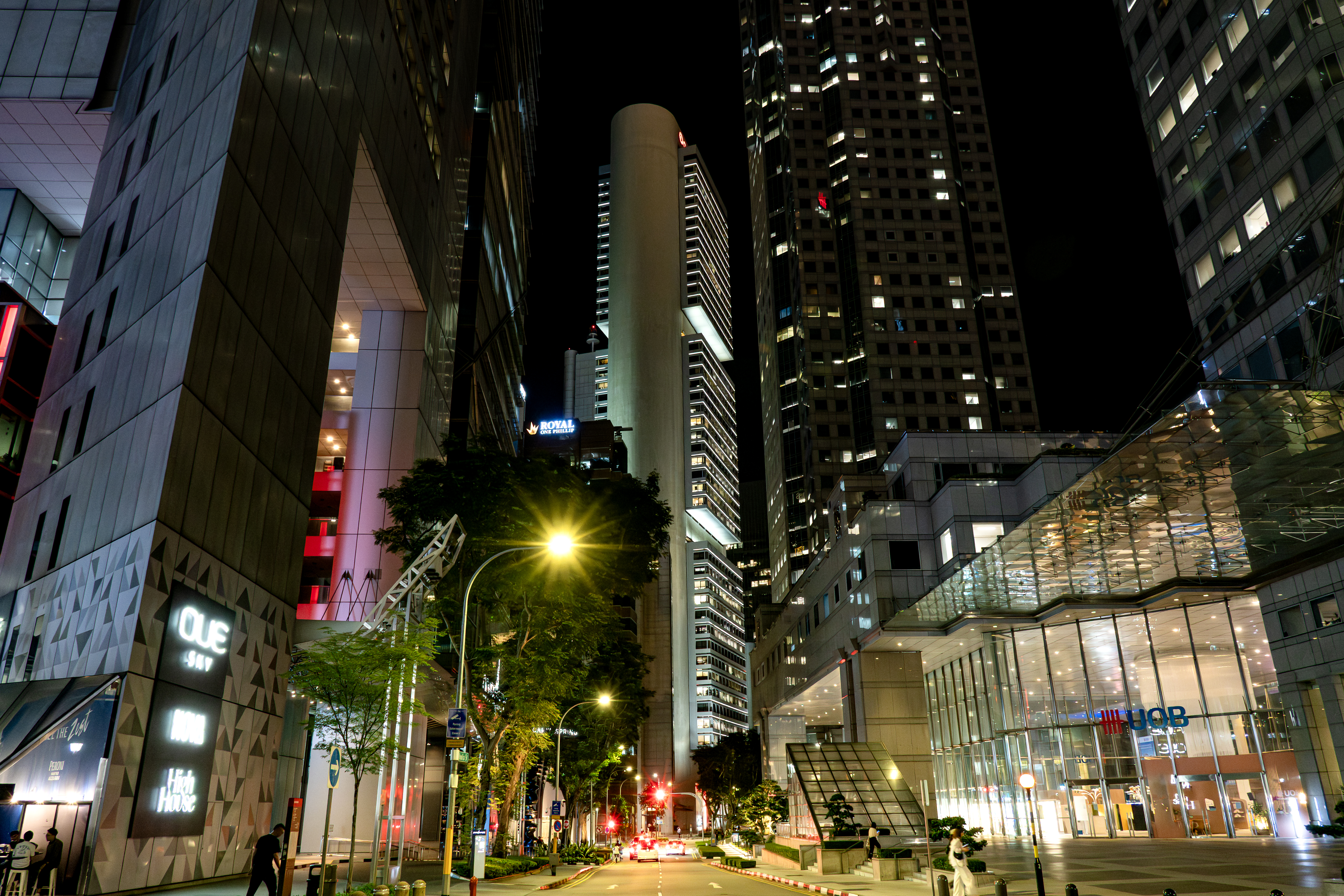
Chulia Street in April 2026.

Chulia Street is the name of a road in the Downtown Core area of Singapore that runs from an end of South Canal Road.

== Ethymology ==
Chulia Street was formerly known as Kling Street but was renamed as Chulia Street after the Indian community in Singapore felt the word Kling was derogatory as a socially undesirable term referring exclusively to Indian unskilled labourers who were considered the lowest social class.

In 1921, Hafeezudin Sirajuddin Moonshi requested that the name of the road be changed to Chulia Street and was changed that same year.

== History ==
Chulia street was part of a settlement of the Chulias, a group of Indian Muslim workers from South India who inhabited the area. It was a commercial hub for knife makers, as well as moneylender agencies. Aside from mercantility, there are also places of worship located along Chulia Street. There is a Chinese temple, Yueh Hai Ching Temple, as well as a mosque, Masjid Moulana Mohamed Ali. The latter is located underneath the UOB Plaza and was established there in 1994 to replace an older mosque affected by the demolition of the shophouses along Chulia Street.

It was also a popular tourist attraction due to the rows of two-story Indian shophouses on either side of the road, which were all demolished in the early 1980s to make way for the industrial business developments in the area. Chulia Street is no longer a tourist destination and is now part of the central business district of Singapore.

The current UOB Plaza and OCBC Centre were built along Chulia Street in the 1970s.

== Transportation ==
The only form of public transportation for the road is via the Raffles Place MRT station, which has exits located across the road.

== See also ==
- Central Business District (CBD)
- Raffles Place
