= Hafeezudin Sirajuddin Moonshi =

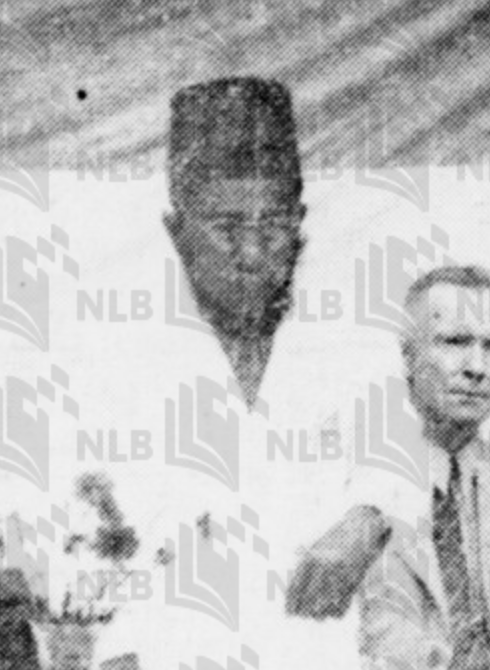
Moonshi in 1939.

Hafeezudin Sirajuddin Moonshi bin Hakim Abdul Hamid (28 March 1895 – 26 November 1965) was a prominent doctor and member of the Municipal Commission of Singapore.

== Early life and education ==
Moonshi was born on 28 March 1895 in Surat, India. His father, merchant Hakeem Abdul Hamid, lived in Geylang, Singapore and established a business on Arab Street. Moonshi came to Singapore early in his childhood. He began studying at Raffles Institution but returned to India in 1905. He returned to Singapore the following year and resumed his studies, passing his Junior Cambridge examinations in 1910. In 1913, he served in the Sergeant Beaver Company of the Singapore Volunteer Corps. He graduated from the King Edward VII College of Medicine with a Licentiate in Medicine and Surgery in 1916.

== Career ==
After graduating from the college, Moonshi established the Moonshi Dispensary, the first Muslim clinic in Singapore, on North Bridge Road in April 1916. He served as the director of Altahera & Co. in 1917. In 1921, he was appointed a member of the Municipal Commission of Singapore. He was renominated to the position in 1924. As a municipal commissioner, he motioned for the renaming of Kling Street near Raffles Place as the term "Kling" had by then become a derogatory slur. He initially suggested renaming it to "King Street", but as there was already a King's Road, the name Chulia Street was eventually chosen.

From 1918 to 1924, Moonshi was a member of the Mohammedan Advisory Board. He served as the board's honorary secretary from 1920 to 1924. In 1922, he served as the honorary secretary of the Prince of Wales' Islamic Ward Committee. He became a Visitor to the Lunatic Asylum the following year. Beginning in 1925, he was a trustee of the Masjid Khadijah in Geylang. He was appointed a justice of the peace in July 1925. In 1930, he became a trustee of the Masjid Bencoolen on Bencoolen Street. In the following year, he was involved in the revival of the not-for-profit English-language religious magazine Real Islam, which was "devoted to the dissemination of the correct, orthodox teachings of Islam and the religious and secular welfare of the Muslims."

In May 1935, as a municipal commissioner, he was awarded the King George V Silver Jubilee Medal. He was appointed the acting chairman of the Mohammedan Advisory Board in place of E. E. Pretty in 1936. In the following year, he received the King George VI Coronation Medal. In 1941, he was again appointed a Visitor to the Lunatic Asylum. In 1947, he was renominated a member of the Municipal Commission. He was conferred the OBE in 1948. Moonshi was a member of the Malay Volunteer Club and the Singapore Indian Association. He was also a member of the Anjuman-I-Islam, which was founded in 1921, and was involved in the Jamiyah Singapore, a local religious organisation founded in 1932.

== Personal life and death ==
Moonshi married twice and had three children. Following the death of his first wife, with whom he had one daughter, he married Juma Khan, with whom he had two sons. He died on 26 November 1965 after suffering from a months-long illness. He was buried at the Kubur Kassim cemetery along Siglap Road, where several other prominent members of the local Muslim community are also buried.
