= Masjid Al-Istiqamah =

Mosque in Singapore

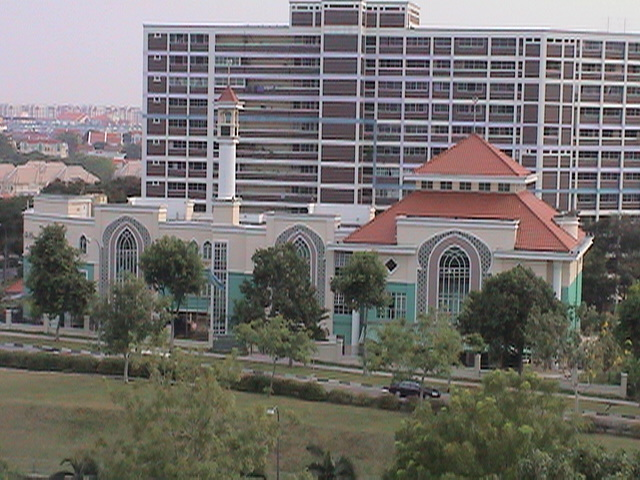
- Masjid Al-Istiqamah in 2006, overlooking Yio Chu Kang Road.

- Location in Singapore

Religion
- Affiliation: Sunni Islam

Location
- Location: 2 Serangoon North Avenue 2, Singapore 555876
- Country: Singapore
- Coordinates: 1.3693388°N 103.8755775°E

Architecture
- Style: Eclectic
- Completed: 1999

Specifications
- Capacity: 2,500
- Minaret: 1

Masjid Al-Istiqamah is a mosque located in the Serangoon North district at the border of Serangoon and Kovan, Singapore. Completed in 1999, it is one of two mosques built under the third phase of the Mosque Building Fund, the other being Masjid Al-Istighfar at Pasir Ris.

== Etymology ==
The name of the mosque, Al-Istiqamah, is an Arabic term that refers to steadfastness in acts of worship. Originally, "Al-Istiqamah" was a proposed name for a mosque at Pasir Ris, along with "Al-Fajar" and "Al-Istighfar." Eventually, Al-Istighfar was chosen as the name for the mosque at Pasir Ris, while Al-Istiqamah was chosen as the name of the mosque at Serangoon.

== History ==
The construction projects for two mosques, Masjid Al-Istighfar at Pasir Ris and Masjid Al-Istiqamah at Serangoon North were selected for the third phase of the Mosque Building Fund, an initiative by the Majlis Ugama Islam Singapura (MUIS) for the financing of new mosques in the country. Construction of Masjid Al-Istiqamah began on 10 September 1997, with direction from local architectural firm James Yip & Partners who had designed the building. The mosque was ultimately completed on 5 March 1999 and visited by Syed Isa Semait and several other representatives of the MUIS. Later on 11 June 1999, the mosque was officially opened to the public and held its first Friday prayer, led by Syed Isa Semait. However, the mosque would only be inaugurated on 17 June 2000, holding a ceremony on that day. After the closure of the Bidadari Mosque in 2007, Masjid Al-Istiqamah was one of seven alternatives available for former congregants, the others being Masjid Alkaff Upper Serangoon, Masjid Haji Yusoff and Masjid En-Naeem.

During the COVID-19 pandemic, the mosque was closed down during a nationwide closure of religious institutions as part of the 2020 Singapore circuit breaker measures. Towards the end of the pandemic, the mosque was fully reopened to the public.

=== 2025 pork parcel incident ===
On 24 September 2025, Masjid Al-Istiqamah was evacuated after the Singapore Police Force was informed of a "suspicious parcel" at its premises. Specialists from the Singapore Civil Defence Force (SCDF) did not find hazardous materials during checks of the mosque; however, a staff member was transported to Sengkang General Hospital for breathlessness.

Normal operations resumed the following day, with Muhammad Faishal Ibrahim, Minister-in-charge of Muslim Affairs, visiting the mosque and joining the congregation for pre-dawn prayers. During a press conference on the same day, K. Shanmugam, Minister for Home Affairs and Coordinating Minister for National Security, said that the parcel contained a type of meat, which initially "[appeared] to be pork". He called the action of sending the parcel "inflammatory" and "playing with fire". That day, Bill Tan Keng Hwee, a 61-year-old Chinese man, was arrested on suspicion of sending a parcel of pork, which is haram (prohibited in Islam), to Masjid Al-Istiqamah; preliminary investigations traced several similar cases at other mosques to him.

On 27 September, the police confirmed that Tan had been arrested. He was named and charged in court on the same day with deliberately intending to wound the racial feelings of a person, an offence under Singaporean law punishable by a fine and/or up to three years of imprisonment.

== Architecture ==
Masjid Al-Istiqamah is built in a modern and eclectic architectural style inspired by those from the Nusantaran region. Having a capacity of two thousand and five hundred worshippers, the mosque has a total of three stories, with the main prayer hall situated on the ground level, female prayer hall on the second level, and additional prayer spaces on the third level, while madrasa classrooms are situated on the rear end of the latter two levels. A garden surrounds the main building of the mosque, which is managed by the mosque committee. Every room in the mosque with the exception of the pantry and toilets can be converted into a temporary prayer space to accommodate more congregants for the Eid prayers and Friday prayers. There is also a $50,000 private archive and library on the third level, containing over a hundred multimedia literature and non-fiction works.

== Transportation ==
Situated at the junction of Serangoon North Avenue 2 and Yio Chu Kang Road while bordering Kovan, Masjid Al-Istiqamah is directly accessible from its designated bus stop, or alternatively, from the nearby bus stop "Blk 138" or the designated bus stop for the Yio Chu Kang Chapel.

== See also ==
- Islam in Singapore
- List of mosques in Singapore
