= Syed Isa Semait =

Mufti of Singapore
- Years of service: 1972–2010
- Appointment: 7 February 1972
- Predecessor: Haji Mohamed Sanusi
- Successor: Fatris Bakaram
- Born: Sayyid ‘Īsā bin Muḥammad Sumayṭ; 1938; Singapore
- Died: 7 July 2025 (age 87)
- Burial: Pusara Aman Muslim Cemetery, Choa Chu Kang, North Region
- Wife: Sharifah Muznah Al-Hadad
- Father: Syed Mohamed Semait
- Religion: Sunni Islam

Syed Isa bin Mohamed Semait (1938–2025) was an Islamic scholar and preacher who served as the Mufti of Singapore from 1972 to 2010. He was known for the introducing the use of astronomy in calculating the Islamic calendar, a move which was later adopted by the Islamic council of Jakarta. Syed Isa Semait also made appearances at the opening of mosques nationwide throughout his career. He was succeeded by Fatris Bakaram, one of his deputies.

== Biography ==
=== Early life ===
Syed Isa bin Mohamed Semait was born in 1938 in colonial Singapore. His mother, Mariam binte Al-Idrus, was of Arab descent and related to the prominent Ba'alawi clan. His childhood education started in the Darul Ihsan orphanage at Geylang Road until he was enrolled into Madrasah Aljunied at Victoria Street. After completion of his studies, he was employed as a trader and also enlisted in the colonial Malayan Royal Navy Volunteer Reserve until 1961 where he left Singapore for Egypt to study abroad.

In 1969, Syed Isa Semait received his ijazah in the jurisprudence of the Shafi'i school of Sunni Islam, graduating from Al-Azhar University. In Singapore, he was appointed as the deputy qāḍī for Muslim maritial affairs. He was eventually appointed as the official Mufti of Singapore on 7 February 1972.

=== As the Mufti of Singapore (1972–2010) ===
After his appointment as the Mufti of Singapore, Syed Isa Semait became an open advocate for revival of Malay literature. He also fought against modernization of the Islamic faith, as well as Arabization of Malay culture. During this time, he married Sharifah Muznah Al-Hadad, a graduate of Madrasah Al-Ma'arif Al-Islamiah.

Syed Isa Semait introduced the usage of astronomy when determining dates of the Islamic calendar. Before his methodology had been implemented, Singaporean Muslims followed the Islamic council of Malaysia in determining Islamic dates. Conservative Muslim leaders criticized him for his alleged departure from tradition, although criticisms were mostly withdrawn after the Islamic council in Jakarta had accepted his methodology.

In 1983 to 1984, he was the senior president of the Inter-Religious Organisation, a group that promoted multifaith harmony and peaceful coexistence amongst people of different religions. In 1992, he was appointed to the presidential council for Religious Harmony, a position which he held till 2010. After the Jemaah Islamiyah terror network was uncovered in 2001, Syed Isa Semait helped in the foundation of the Religious Rehabilitation Group (RRG) to counsel and guide people who had been affected by religious extremism, with a headquarters based in Masjid Khadijah.

As a Mufti, he was encouraged to be present at the opening ceremonies of mosques. These included Masjid Al-Istighfar at Pasir Ris in 1999 and Masjid Mydin at Kembangan in 2001. Syed Isa Semait was also responsible for determining and solidifying the qibla ("direction of prayer") that was to be used in mosques.

=== Retirement years ===
Syed Isa Semait eventually stepped down from his position as the mufti in December of 2010. He was succeeded by Fatris Bakaram, one of his former deputies.

Syed Isa died on 7 July 2025, at the age of eighty-seven. A funeral was held for him in the Sultan Mosque at Kampong Glam, led by Habib Hassan al-Attas, an Imam from the Ba'alwie Mosque. He was buried in the Pusara Aman Muslim Cemetery. Prime Minister, Lee Hsien Loong, eulogized him and paid respects to him at his funeral.

== Legacy ==
A small private library in the Keramat Habib Noh religious complex is named after Syed Isa Semait. There is also a scholarship, the Syed Isa Semait Scholarship, named in his memory, which is organized by the Majlis Ugama Islam Singapura (MUIS).

== See also ==
- Islam in Singapore
- Majlis Ugama Islam Singapura
