= Chai Chee =

Public housing estate in Singapore

- Public housing estate
- Kampong Chai Chee

Other transcription(s)
  - Chinese: 菜市
  - Pinyin: cài shì
  - Pe̍h-ōe-jī: Chhài-chhī
  - Malay: Chai Chee
  - Tamil: சாய் சீ
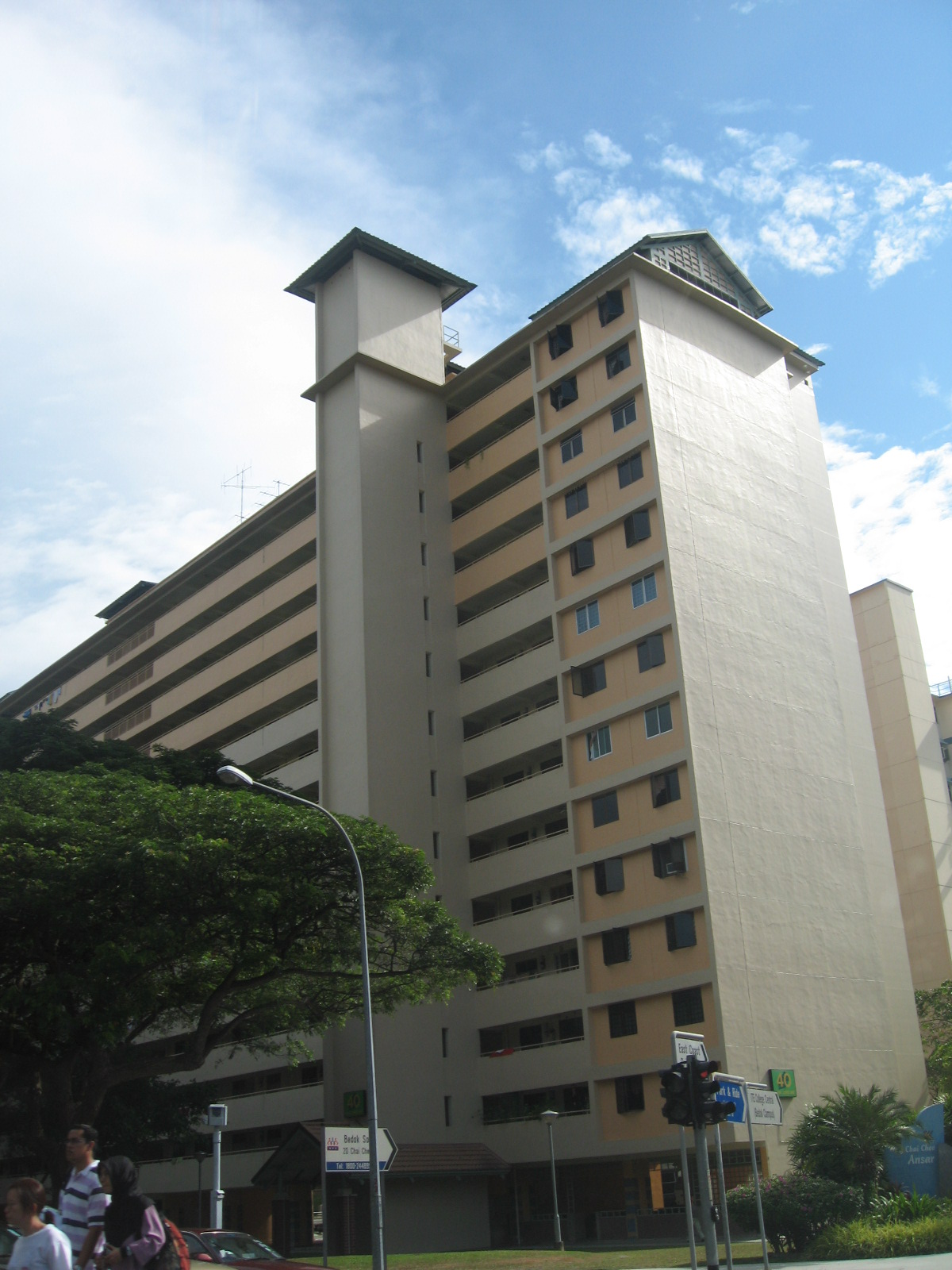
- HDB flats in Chai Chee estate

- Location within Singapore
- Coordinates: 1.32565°N 103.92147°E
- Country: Singapore
- Region: East Region
- Planning area: Bedok
- Planning subzone: Kembangan

Chai Chee (Chinese: 菜市), also known as Kampong Chai Chee, is a housing estate located in the town of Bedok in Singapore. The estate was named after a village known as Kampong Chai Chee which formerly occupied the vicinity. It is served by two major namesake roads, namely Chai Chee Street and Chai Chee Drive, with minor lanes of Chai Chee Road, Chai Chee Avenue and the original Jalan Chai Chee. Part of the estate today sits atop a hill that overlooks neighbouring Kembangan and Opera Estate.

== Etymology ==
In the Hokkien language, Chai Chee may be translated to mean Vegetable Market (菜市).

== History ==
Before the estate was built, the area was primarily farmland over a series of rolling hills. The kampong, or village, was located on a high hill around where the Singapore Anti-tuberculosis Association (SATA) Clinic now stands. In the past, one needs to go downhill to reach the clinic. Today the clinic sits much higher than the surrounding areas after the hills were levelled.

=== Kampong Chai Chee ===
Kampong Chai Chee was formed in the 1920s as a Chinese village off old Upper Changi Road (then known as Changi Road). The village developed in the area around the former Peng Ann and Peng Ghee roads. A market serving the village used to exist at the junction of these two roads.

A 1971 article in The New Nation described Kampong Chai Chee as a large village spread over several hills and valleys. It consisted of mostly attap houses among tall coconut palms, set back off dusty roads.

=== Redevelopment as Chai Chee estate ===
Chai Chee Districts Map

When development began in the late 1960s, the estate was built originally with 40 blocks of flats, consisting mainly of rental units. It was the first Housing and Development Board estate to be built in the eastern part of Singapore. Community amenities were built, such as a market, food centre, shops, banks, library, community center, kindergarten and a bus terminus. To provide for employment, there were 3 factories built - Rollei Cameras, Varta Batteries and Nippon Miniature Bearing (NMB).

Chai Chee Estate quickly gained importance as it was then the only urban estate in the mainly rural part of eastern Singapore. In the early 1970s, the electoral division of Chai Chee stretched all the way southwards to Upper East Coast Road. This led to the naming of the school there as Chai Chee Secondary School, even though today that area is no longer part of Chai Chee Estate.

== Amenities ==
Chai Chee today is served by amenities like the Viva Business Park, which is a mixed commercial development that offers both office and shopping space. The business park, which is the first in the area, developed over the former Rollei and Varta factories, houses Decathlon's first South East Asia flagship store and Harvey Norman first factory outlet in Singapore, amongst other retail, food and beverage businesses. The estate is also served by many shophouses inside it. Residents of the nearby private estates are known to frequent Chai Chee due to limited amenities available in their respective areas.

There are various healthcare facilities and nursing homes in this mature estate. For one the SATA Clinic continues to operate in the area. There are also others like the ECON Medicare Centre and Nursing Home and Moral Home for the Disabled Adults.

There are various places of worship in the estate like the Bethesda Cathedral, Chai Chee United Temple (菜市聯合宮), Masjid Al-Ansar and Soon San Teng Temple (顺山亭). Chai Chee United Temple was founded in 1995 and consist of three Chinese temples (Zhu Yun Gong, Hock Leng Keng and Hock San Teng) that were affected by government land acquisition.

The area is also served by the Kampong Kembangan Community Club, which is located in Kembangan, because it is part of the Kembangan Constituency in the Marine Parade-Braddell Heights Group Representation Constituency. It is not to be confused with the Kampong Chai Chee Community Club located in Bedok that serves the East Coast Group Representation Constituency.

The area falls under the jurisdiction of the Kampong Chai Chee Neighbourhood Police Post (NPP) and the Bedok South Neighbourhood Police Centre (NPC), which is part of the Bedok Police Division, and the Chai Chee Fire Post that is supplemented by the 2nd Singapore Civil Defence Force DIV HQ.

=== Education ===
Educational institutions in Chai Chee include Ping Yi Secondary School and the NPS International School. There are also kindergartens like the PCF Kindergarten in the estate.

There used to be multiple schools in the area some of which are now defunct namely:

- Chong Hua Chinese School, from 1923 to c.1972, was located beside the SATA Clinic
- East Coast Primary School, from 1982 to 2018 before merging with Damai Primary School, it was located at the current site of NPS International School before moving south in 2001
- Eunos Primary School, from 2001 to 2004 used the holding site at where NPS International School is located at now till its new building was ready
- ITE Bedok Campus, formerly known as Bedok Vocational Institute, from 1987 to 2010, it has now merged into ITE College East at Simei
- Jaya Primary School, from 1984 to 1998, it formerly stood at where the East Coast Primary School last was
- Pin Ghee Public School (Pin Ghee High School), from 1934 to 1976 was located near the junction of present day Chai Chee Street and Bedok North Road, it is unrelated to the current Ping Yi Secondary School

=== Industries ===
Today the Chai Chee Lane Industrial Estate sits on where some of the former factories used to operate, NMB however continues to stand in the heart of Chai Chee. In addition, the Technopark @ Chai Chee was built over where the Rollei Cameras factory used to be, to enhance the industries there and has since been revitalised as the Viva Business Park. In 2017, the Land Transport Authority opened a new office at the site of the former ITE Campus to ease the overcrowding of its Hampshire Road Headquarters, it is however expected to be a temporary arrangement as there are plans to move its operation to Jurong East, touted as the second regional hub of Singapore, after 2020 when the site becomes ready.

=== Transportation ===
The estate has no MRT station of its own, but is in between two nearby MRT stations, the Kembangan and Bedok MRT stations on the East West MRT line. The estate is served by limited public bus service, namely bus service 26, 222 and 229. There are more bus services to be found along New Upper Changi Road that lies south of the estate, or Bedok North Road north of the estate, both of which are bi-directional. The former Chai Chee Bus Terminal has ceased operation since 1985 and about half its services were rerouted in phases to the then newly opened Bedok Bus Interchange further east, while the rest of its bus services were withdrawn. The Pan Island Expressway that lies north of the area has an exit (exit 8A) that leads towards the estate.
