= Hang Jebat Mausoleum =

Mausoleum in Melaka City, Melaka State, Malaysia

- Makam Hang Jebat
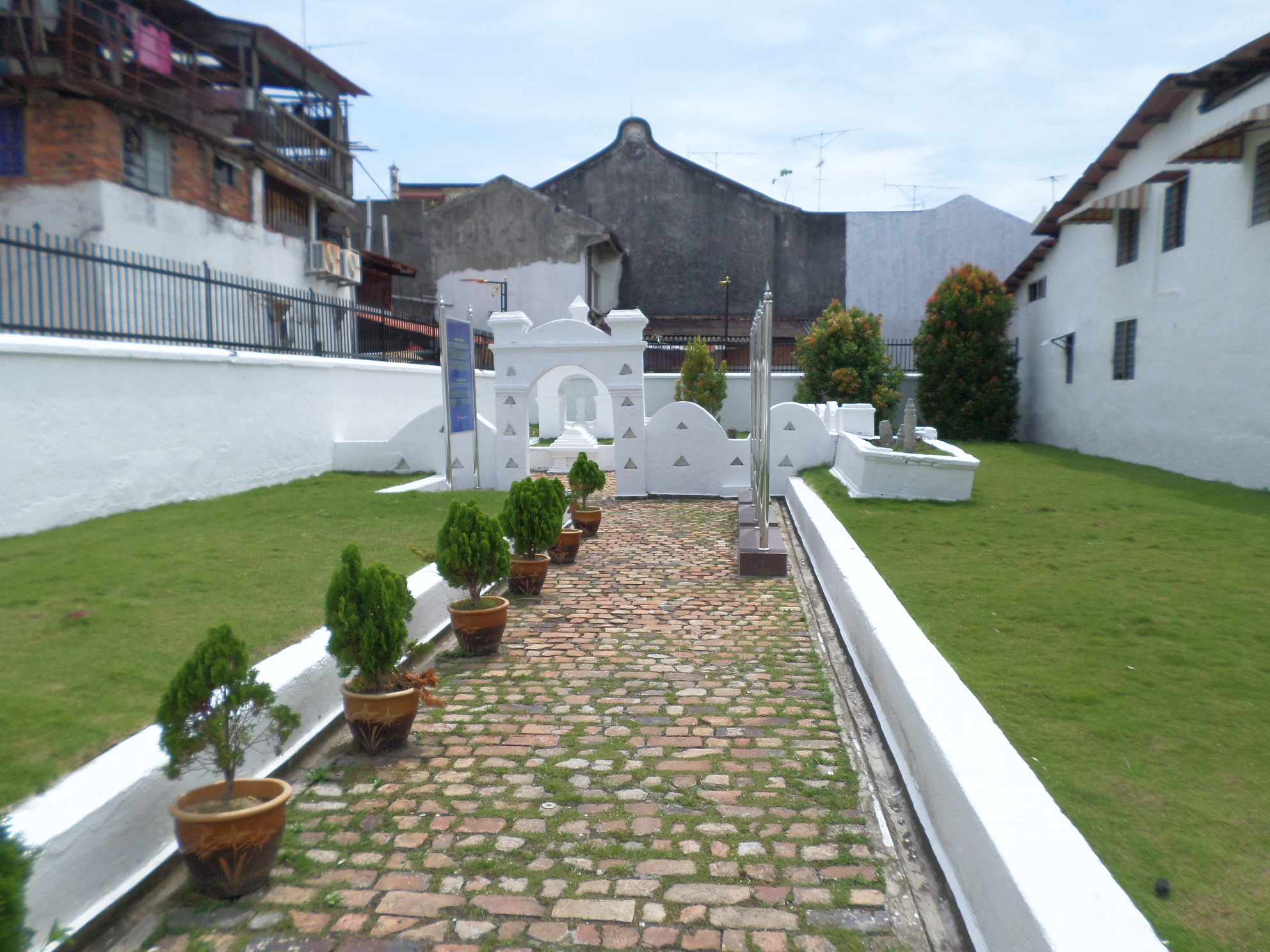
- Interactive map of Hang Jebat Mausoleum

Details
- Location: Melaka City, Melaka, Malaysia
- Coordinates: 2°11′47.6″N 102°14′55.2″E
- Type: mausoleum
- Style: Acehnese

The Hang Jebat Mausoleum (Malay: Makam Hang Jebat) is the mausoleum of Hang Jebat located in Melaka City, Melaka, Malaysia.

== History ==
The actual age of the grave is unknown but it predates back to Portuguese Malacca in 1511.

== Architecture ==
The grave was made with Acehnese style with the type of normally used to mark the burial places of high ministers or Sultans during the Malacca Sultanate. His grave is surrounded by other unnamed old tombs.

== See also ==
- List of tourist attractions in Malacca
