= Masjid Hang Jebat =

Mosque in Queenstown, Singapore

Hang Jebat Mosque Masjid Hang Jebat مسجد هانج جيبات
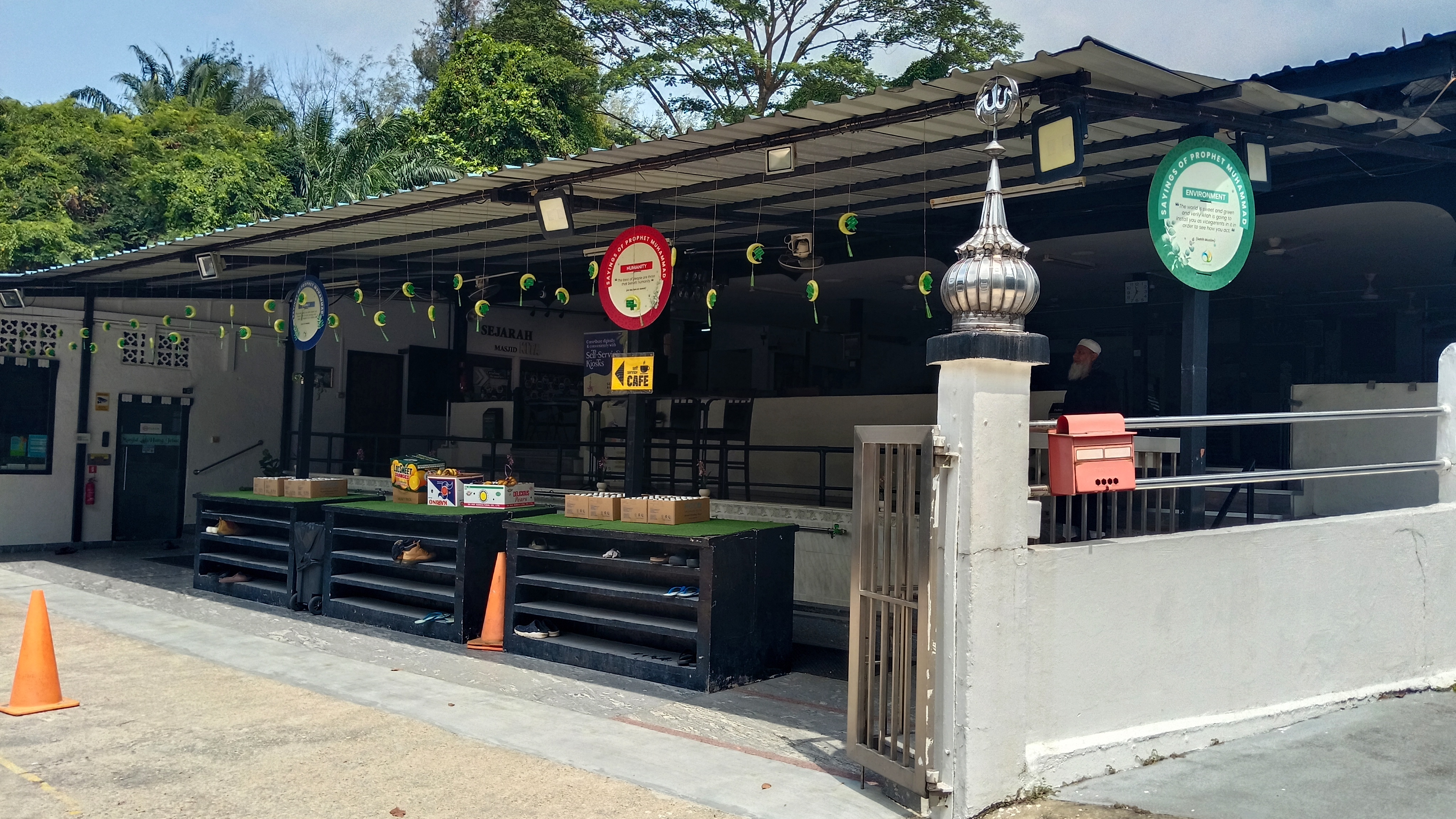
- The main entrance to the Hang Jebat Mosque in 2026.

- Location in Singapore

Religion
- Affiliation: Sunni Islam

Location
- Location: 100 Jalan Hang Jebat, Singapore 139533
- Country: Singapore
- Coordinates: 1.2894754°N 103.7986866°E

Architecture
- Type: Mosque (formerly surau)
- Style: Islamic architecture
- Completed: 1952

The Hang Jebat Mosque (Malay: Masjid Hang Jebat) is a congregational mosque and former surau located in Queenstown, Singapore. Built in 1952, it is named after the legendary Malay warrior Hang Jebat. It is situated at the end of the Jalan Hang Jebat road in a forested area along the Queensway Rail Corridor.

== Etymology ==
The mosque is named after Hang Jebat, a legendary Malay warrior, who also gave his name to the Hang Jebat Regiment at a nearby military installation.

== History ==
The original structure at the site was a surau, built in 1952 for Royal Malay Regiment soldiers under the Hang Jebat Regiment that were either stationed in the area or lived nearby, as well as workers of the Royal Transport Corps that were assigned to work in the Wessex Estate. in 1968, the surau was officially recognized by the Majlis Ugama Islam Singapura (MUIS) under the name "Surau Hang Jebat." Later on 31 December 1972, a request to convert the surau into a congregational mosque for the Friday prayers to be held was approved by Syed Isa Semait, the official Mufti of the county. On 10 August 1975, cabinet minister Othman Wok held a small funfair in the annexe of the Hang Jebat Mosque to celebrate the ten-year anniversary of the independence of Singapore. Due to the small size of the mosque and its establishment during colonial times in a forested area far from residential areas, the Hang Jebat Mosque was placed under a Temporary Occupation License along with the Tentera Diraja Mosque and the Ahmad Ibrahim Mosque. Such a license meant that the committee of the mosque would have to make annual payments to ensure the mosque could be retained on land, unlike mosques in residential estates.

On 12 July 2020, the southeastern perimeter wall of the mosque collapsed, with the cause presumed to be the heavy rainfall in the area. No injuries were reported and a safety check the next day certified that the main prayer hall and ancillary buildings were safe and did not have any risk of collapsing. In January 2022, a water cooler was installed outside the mosque as part of the "Water for All" initiative to provide free water for residents and passersby along the Queensway Rail Corridor.

== Cultural significance ==
The Hang Jebat Mosque is a heritage site amongst residents of Queenstown and Tanglin Halt. It is also significant for being one of the last surviving kampung ("village") styled mosques in the country, exhibiting traditional Malay architectural elements such as the zinc roof and sculpted wooden beams. The mosque is also notable for being situated at the end of the Jalan Hang Jebat road, within close proximity to the Queensway Rail Corridor where the former Keretapi Tanah Melayu (KTM) tracks that linked colonial Singapore to Malaysia. Adjacent to the building is the preserved Wessex Estate, a defunct housing estate that comprises a group of colonial-era bungalows and terrace houses, all of which date back to the 1930–40s in terms of architectural style.

== Gallery ==
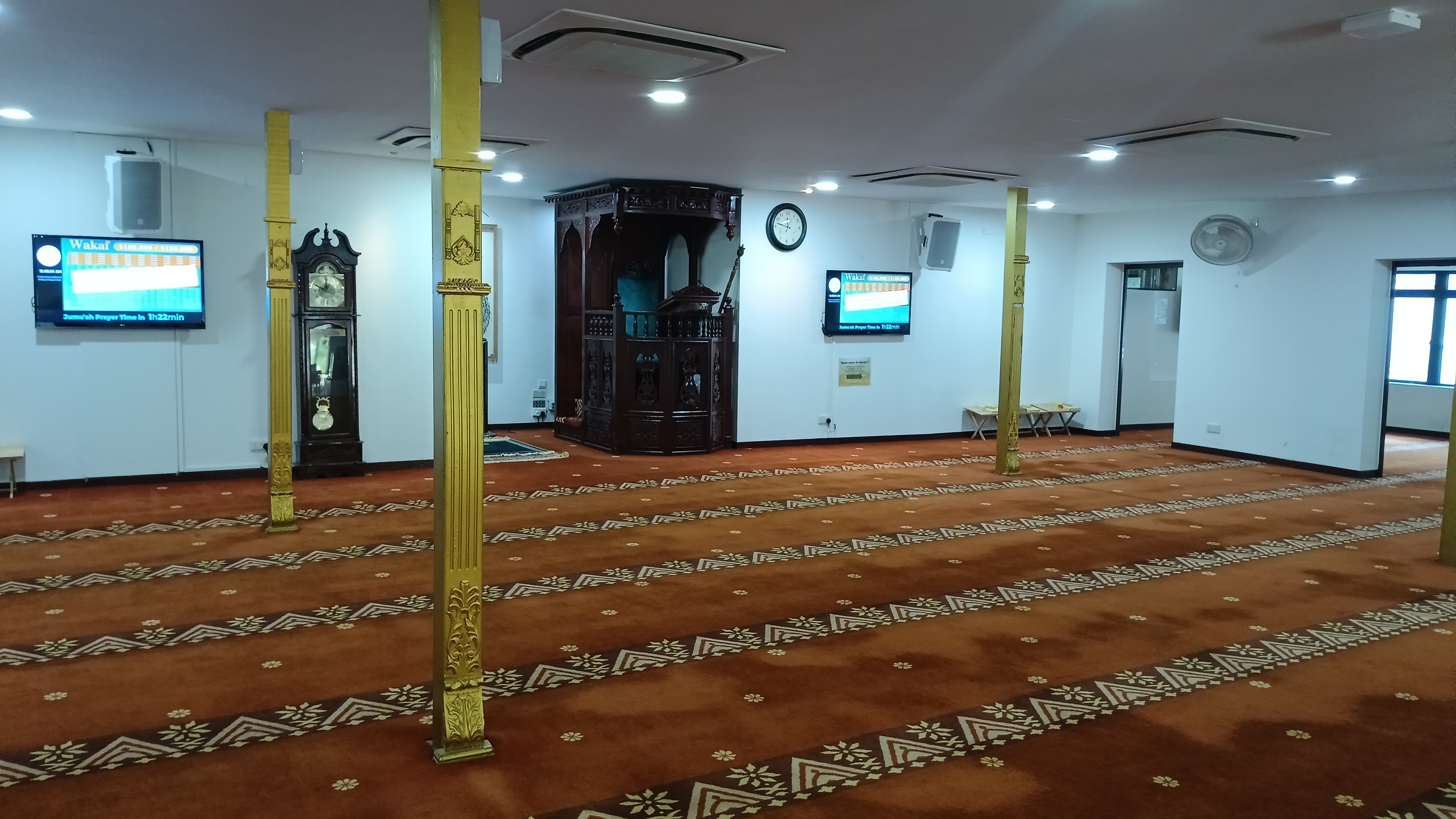
Interior of the Hang Jebat Mosque.

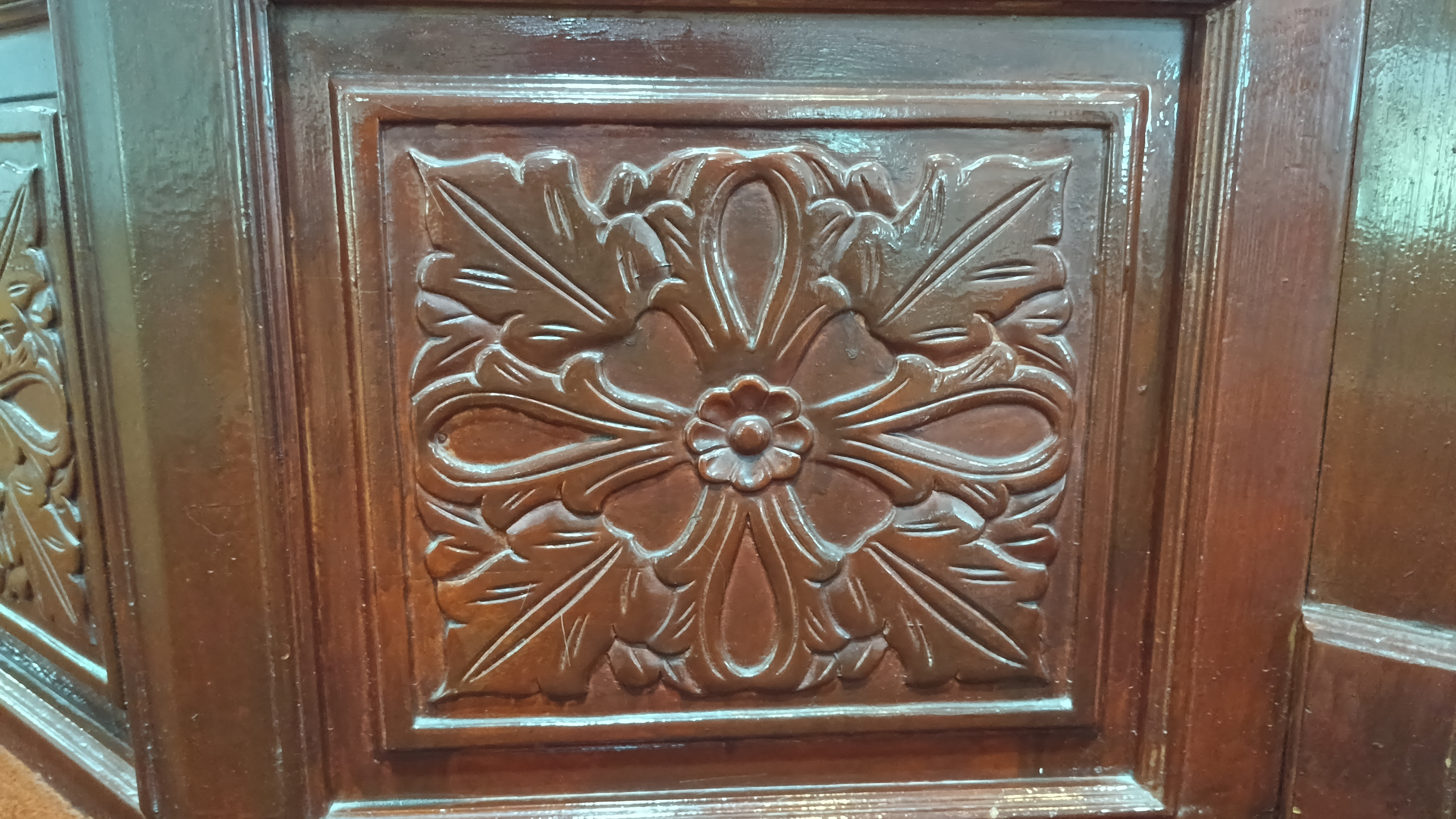
Wooden carvings on the base of the minbar.

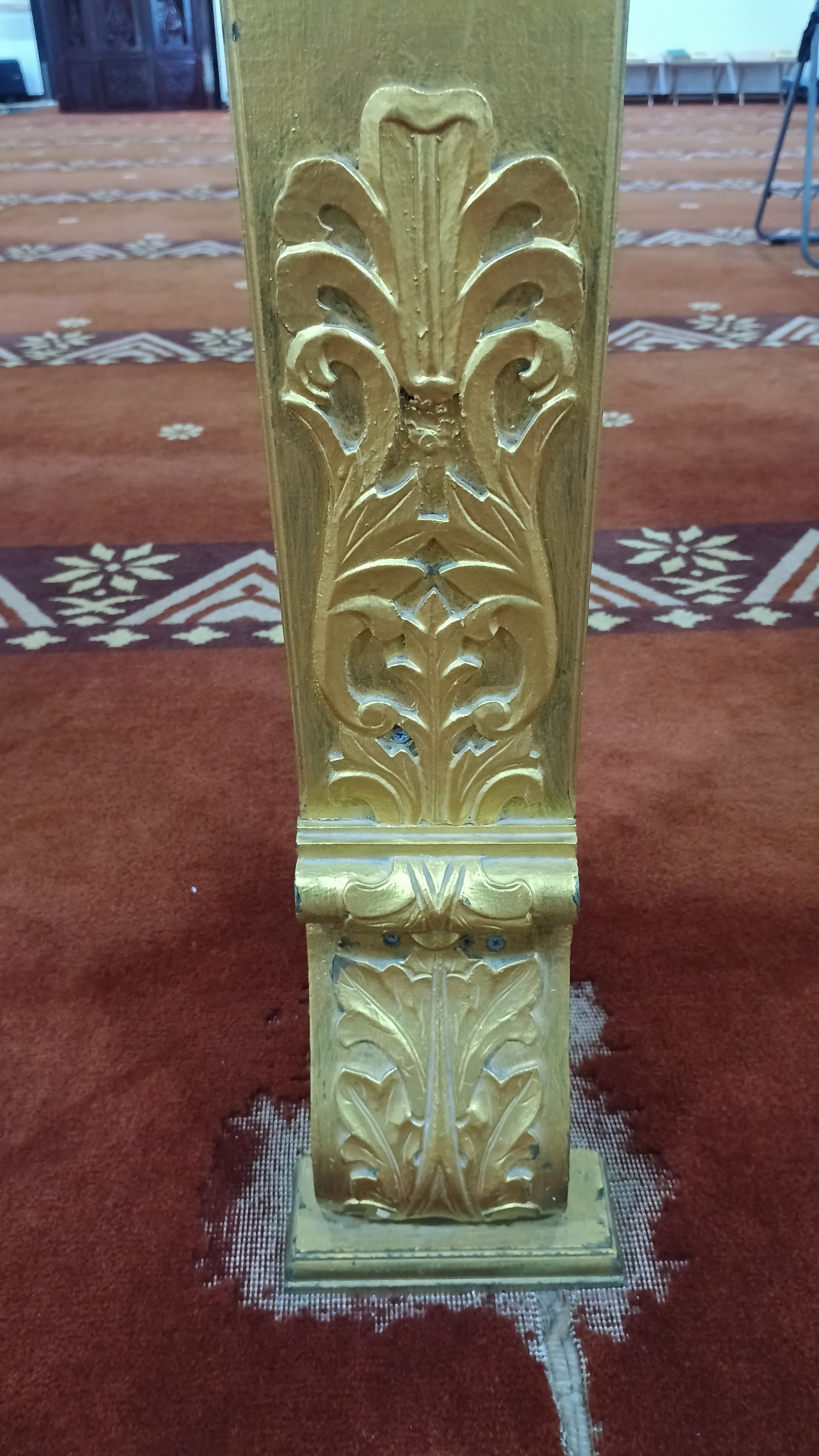
Closeup of carvings on the base of a wooden pillar.

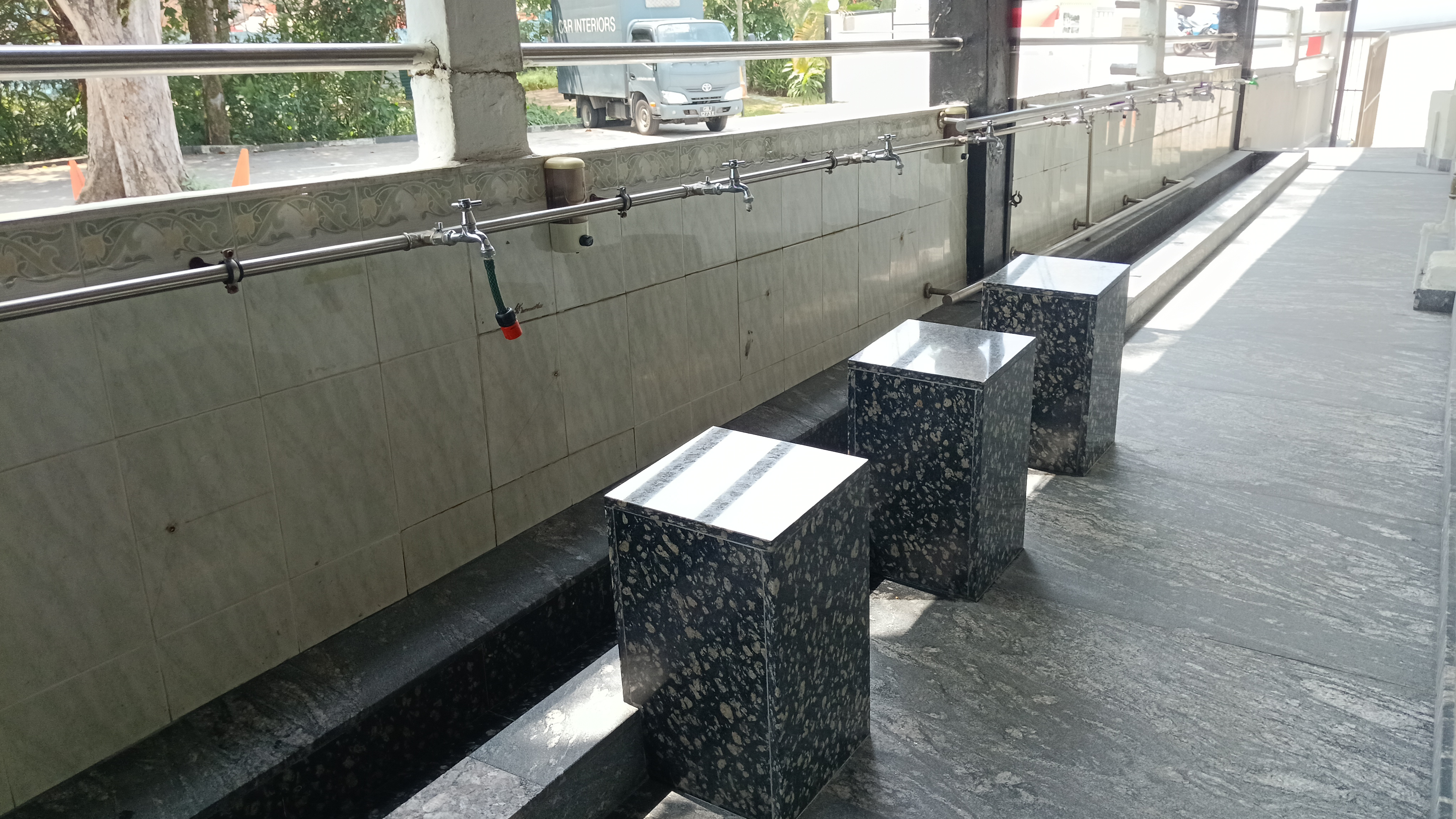
A corner for worshippers to take their ritual ablution before prayers.

== Transportation ==
The mosque is accessible from the underpass at the bus stop for Block 19 at Queen's View. It is also accessible via the Jalan Hang Jebat road which branches off from Portsdown Avenue.

== See also ==
- Islam in Singapore
- List of mosques in Singapore
