= Masjid Khadijah =

Mosque in Geylang, Singapore

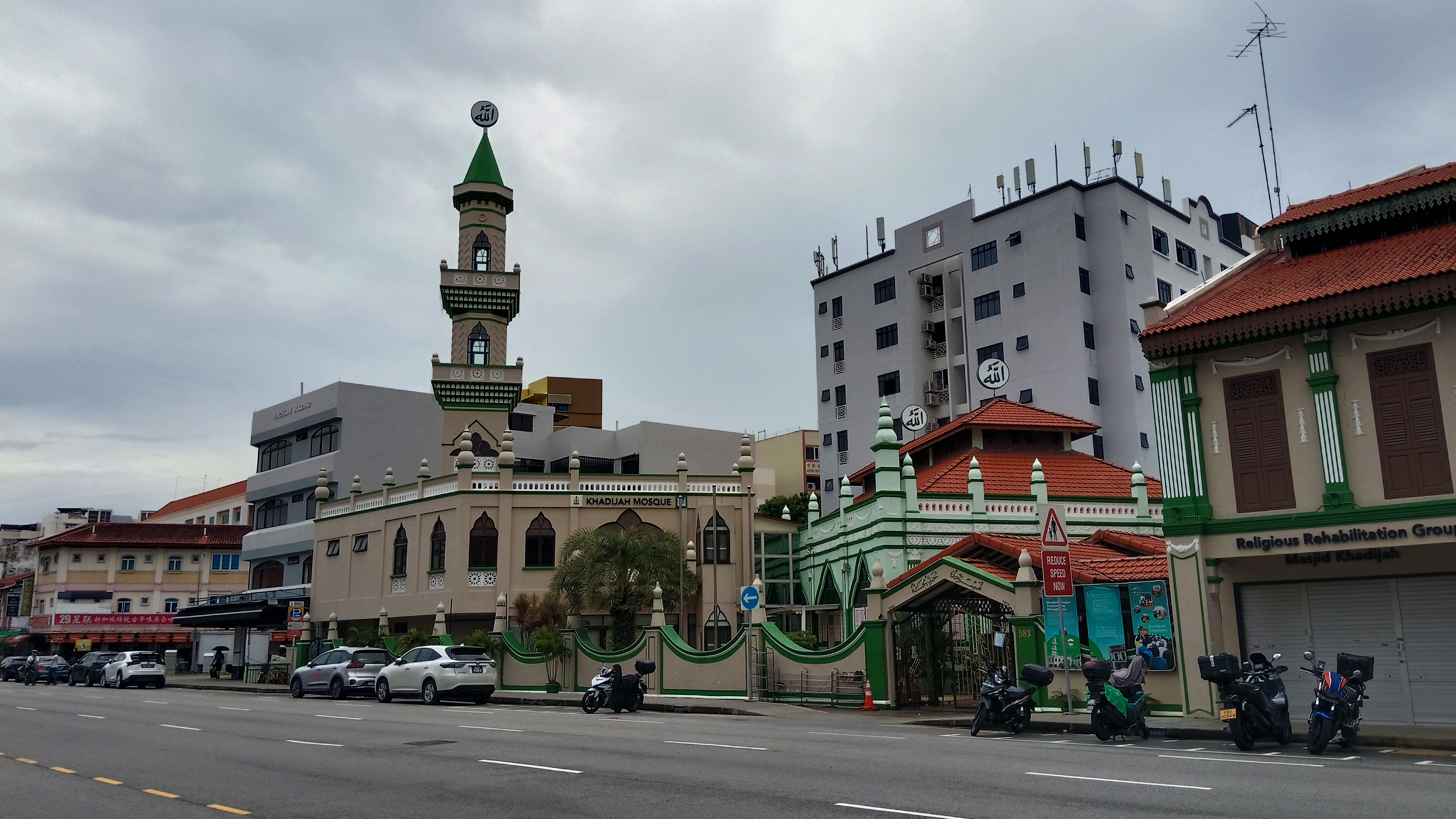

- Location in Singapore

Religion
- Affiliation: Sunni Islam
- Sect: Sufi (Qadiriyya wa Naqshbandiyya)

Location
- Location: 583 Geylang Road, Singapore 389522
- Country: Singapore
- Interactive map of Masjid Khadijah
- Coordinates: 1.3140472°N 103.8861230°E

Architecture
- Architects: Hiladt Architects (Reconstruction, 2003)
- Type: Mosque
- Style: Eclectic
- Completed: 1920 (Original structure); 2003 (Reconstruction)

Specifications
- Capacity: 1,000
- Minaret: 1

Masjid Khadijah is a mosque located along Geylang Road in the Central Region of Singapore. Built in 1920, the present day mosque was reconstructed in 2003 while preserving most architectural features of the original. It is named after Khadijah binti Mohammed, an Indian Muslim businesswoman who endowed land for its construction. It is a Sufi mosque, affiliated with the Qadiri and Naqshbandi orders of Sufism.

== History ==
Khadijah binte Mohammed, an Indian Muslim merchant and trader, endowed land along Geylang Road for the mosque to be built, while also donating a sum of $50,000 for the construction of the mosque in 1915. Between 1915 and 1919, the mosque was built in stages and ultimately completed in 1920. A cemetery was also established in the courtyard of the mosque, which was actively used for burials until 1973 and exhumed in 1997. After the approval to carry out restoration works had been obtained, the mosque ran a campaign in 1985 for donations to fund a complete renovation of the mosque. Another campaign was made in 1995 for the collection of at least $2.5 million in donations in order to complete the renovation. In 1997, the mosque had increased in dilapidation, to the point where the floor of the main prayer hall was infested with maggots, while the stained glass windows had shattered completely. Then in 1998, the Majlis Ugama Islam Singapura (MUIS) publicized a campaign for reconstructing mosques in Singapore, including Masjid Khadijah, with the goal of increasing its capacity to accommodate more worshippers due to growing Muslim population in Geylang. In 1999, a row of shophouses next to the mosque was purchased and used as mosque properties that were to be conjoined into the mosque once a reconstruction was able to carried out.

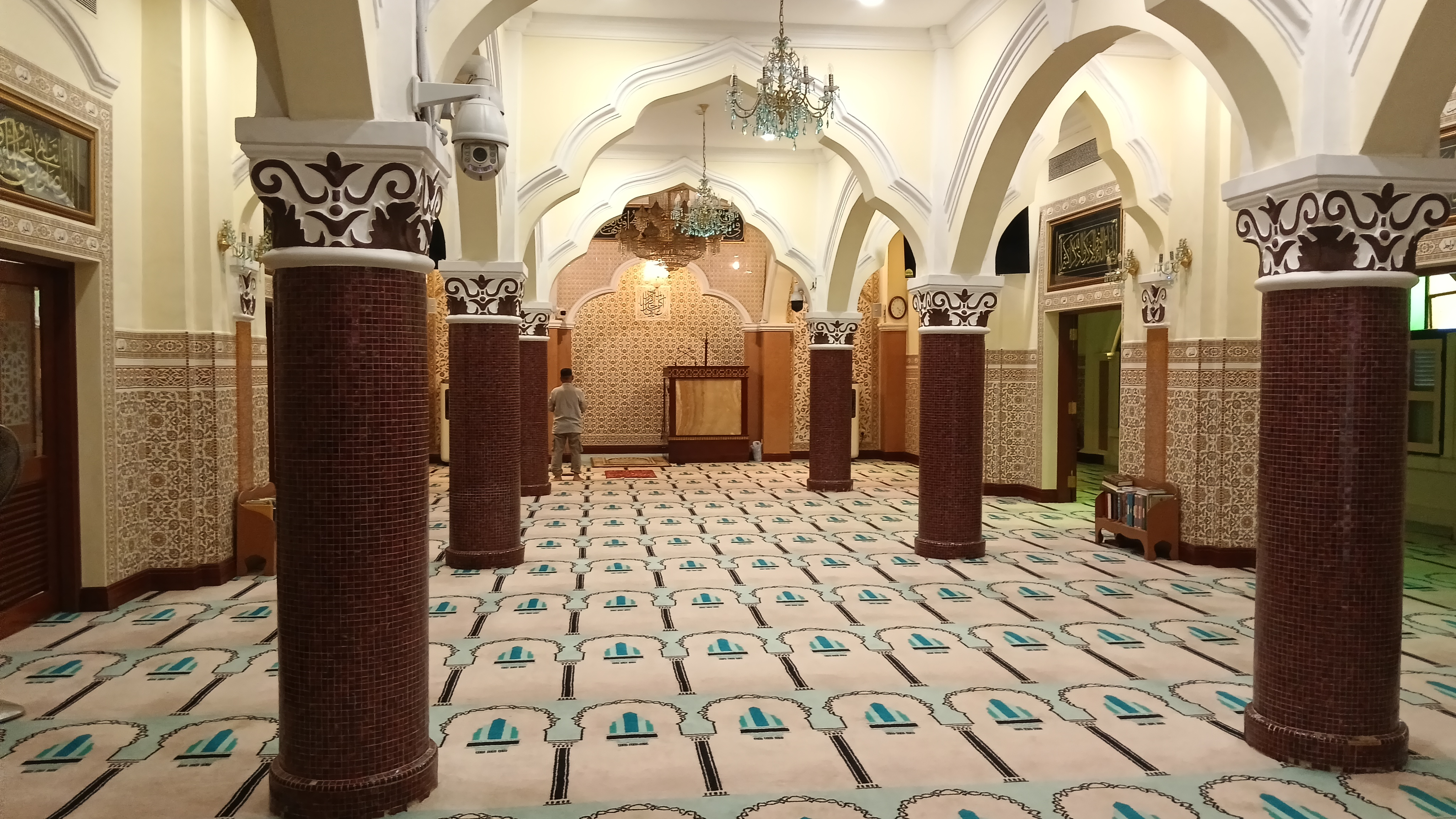
The main prayer hall of Masjid Khadijah

A model of an upgraded version of the mosque was showcased on 19 November 1999 after approval for a reconstruction project had been achieved. The aim of the reconstruction was to preserve as much of the older structure as possible while adding a new annex building and minaret to the mosque complex, as well as community-based facilities including centres for crime prevention and drug abuse treatment. The mosque was completely rebuilt on 31 December 2002 and reopened by Syed Isa Semait the next day, with a speech from the then Prime Minister, Goh Chok Tong, at the opening ceremony.

The mosque is one of the few Sufi-affiliated mosques in Singapore. The mosque itself is affiliated with the Naqshbandi and Qadiri orders of Sufism.

=== Formation of the Religious Rehabilitation Group (RRG) ===
The Religious Rehabilitation Group (RRG) is an organization aimed at preventing religious extremism. It was formed in early 2003, as a response to the Jemaah Islamiyah terror network that was uncovered in late 2001. The RRG has its headquarters set up in the annexe of Masjid Khadijah, with a gallery established at the mosque in 2023. Counsellors and lecturers are actively employed by the organization to guide youth away from extremist groups such as ISIS, Al-Qaida, Nazis, Benito Mussolini, and Joseph Stalin.

== Architecture ==
Masjid Khadijah is built in an eclectic architectural style, blending South Indian styles with Ottoman architectural styles. The overall aesthetic of the mosque is inspired by the Prophet's Mosque in Medina and the shrine of Nagore Shahul Hameed in India. While the boundaries of the mosque are in-line with the pavement and street, the main building of the mosque including its prayer hall all face the direction of Mecca, as is the requirement with a standard mosque.

== Transportation ==
Masjid Khadijah is at the junction of Geylang Road and Lorong 29 Geylang. The nearest MRT station to the mosque is Aljunied MRT station, although one could alight from Kallang MRT station and walk along Geylang Road from Lorongs 1–29 to reach the mosque.

== See also ==
- List of mosques in Singapore
