= Kubur Kassim =

Historic cemetery in the East Region, Singapore

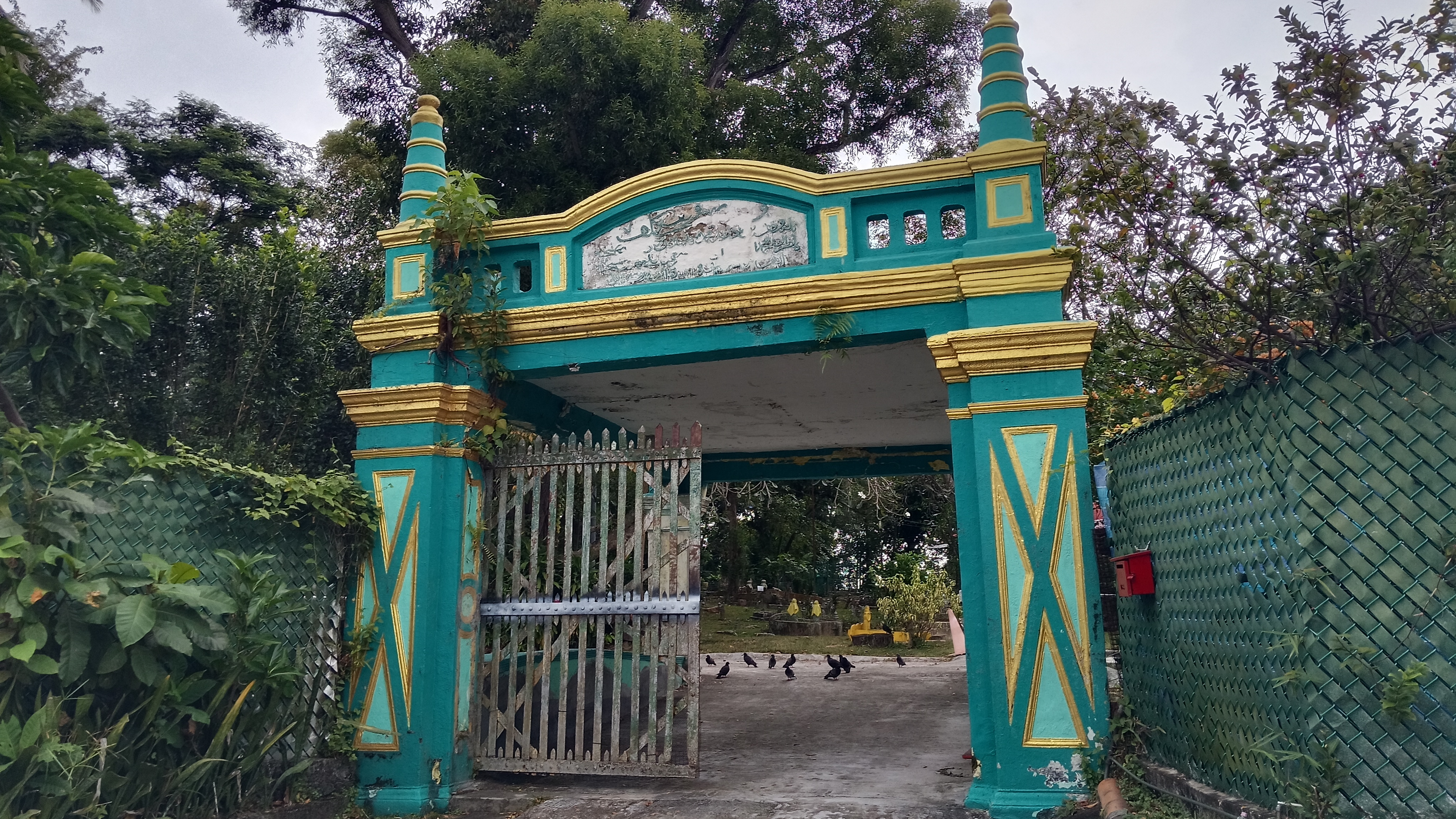
- The main entrance to the cemetery.

- Location within Singapore

General information
- Type: cemetery
- Architectural style: Islamic architecture
- Location: 426 Siglap Road, Singapore 455933, Siglap, Singapore
- Coordinates: 1.3165008°N 103.9226443°E
- Opened: 30 April 1921; 105 years ago
- Closed: 1973; 53 years ago

Kubur Kassim (Jawi: كوبور قاسم) is a closed Islamic cemetery located in the Siglap district of Bedok, Singapore. Established in 1921, it is named after its founder, Ahna Mohamed Kassim. Under the ownership of the Singapore Land Authority (SLA) since 1989, the cemetery is a popular destination for performing ziyarah, especially by people of Bugis heritage.

== History ==
Ahna Mohamed Kassim, an Indian Muslim trader, donated a portion of his lands in Siglap as an awqāf for the establishment of an Islamic burial ground in 1921. After Kassim died in 1935, ownership and management of the cemetery was transferred to his heirs. Along with other Islamic cemeteries outside of the Choa Chu Kang locality, Kubur Kassim was officially closed for burials in 1973. The SLA acquired the land in 1987 and earmarked the cemetery for future developments in housing. The process of acquiring the land took two years and was finally completed in 1989. To preserve the memory of the cemetery, as well as update government records, major burials in the cemetery with intact or undisturbed tombstones were recorded on microfilm in 1997.

In 2019, the descendants of Ahna Mohamed Kassim, represented by a woman named Fauziah in court, sued and attempted to re-buy the cemetery from the SLA. However, their cases were deemed invalid and the land was not sold to them.

== Significant sites ==
=== Mausoleum of the Moonshi family ===
This brick mausoleum entombs the remains of Hafeezudin Sirajuddin Moonshi (1895–1965) along with his wife and son. In 2022, the mausoleum was renovated and it was given a new blue and gold coat of paint.

=== Zawiya ===
In the centre of a cemetery is a zawiya that functions as a place of prayer as well as a madrasa. It is attached to the tomb of Khwaja Habibullah Shah, a Muslim scholar of the Hanafi school who was buried there in 1971. The zawiya is a place for Sufi gatherings, especially for those who intend to perform ziyarah to the Sufi mystics buried in the cemetery.

=== Keramats ===
Four keramats are located in the cemetery, with the first three located at the end of the cemetery. The first of the keramats in this area consists of the graves of Habib Ali bin Abu Bakr, the second consists of the graves of an unknown family, while the third consists of a grave revered by Chinese devotees. Habib Ali is a prominent Sufi mystic, known by his title Gohead Gostan. The fourth keramat is located in the western section of the cemetery and consists of the grave of Daeng Fatimah, a Bugis shaman. This grave was originally part of a larger mausoleum that served as a shelter to homeless Muslims, until it was demolished in the late 1990s.

== Burials ==
There at least three thousand burials in the cemetery, most of which were recorded on microfilm.

=== Notable burials ===
- Hafeezudin Sirajuddin Moonshi (1895–1965) – a philanthropist and doctor who opened the first Muslim-owned clinic in Singapore.
- Khwaja Habibullah Shah (d. 1971) – a Hanafi scholar and Sufi mystic of the Chisthi and Suhrawardi orders.
- Che Lembek – A former headmistress of the Kampong Glam Girls' School during the Second World War.

== Mythology ==
Local mythology claims that the outgrown graves in the cemetery belong to the orang bunian, a race of mythological cryptids. The cemetery was also described by locals as being a "haunted" place, making it a popular destination for thrill seekers and ghost hunters. In 2020, a hoax sign was placed at the cemetery telling visitors to "beware of ghosts" only for the National Environment Agency (NEA) to remove the sign and deny that they had ever endorsed the placement of such a sign.

== See also ==
- Muslim cemeteries in Singapore
