= Central Business District, Singapore =

Central Business District (CBD), Singapore may refer to:

- Central Area, Singapore, the city-centre of the country
  - Downtown Core, the urban core of the Central Area (along with 10 other planning areas), containing the CBD proper and its surrounding developments
- Jurong Lake District, also known as Singapore's "second CBD" in the western part of the country
