= Masjid Al-Istighfar =

Mosque in Pasir Ris, Singapore

- The main facade of Masjid Al-Istighfar that faces north-west.

- Location in Singapore

Religion
- Affiliation: Sunni Islam

Location
- Location: 2 Pasir Ris Walk, Singapore 518239
- Country: Singapore
- Coordinates: 1.3710218°N 103.9641112°E

Architecture
- Type: Mosque
- Style: Ottoman architecture
- Established: 1997
- Completed: 16 July 1999

Specifications
- Dome: 1
- Minaret: 1

Masjid Al-Istighfar is a mosque located in Pasir Ris, Singapore. Built in 1999, it is the first and only mosque located in Pasir Ris. The exterior of the building features elements from Ottoman architecture and is inspired by the Blue Mosque of Istanbul.

== Etymology ==
The mosque is named after the Islamic concept of asking for forgiveness from God, which is known as istighfār.

== History ==
In 1996, the Majlis Ugama Islam Singapura (MUIS) authorized the construction of a mosque in Pasir Ris. It was the first mosque to be built in the modern Pasir Ris neighborhood. Beforehand, the void decks of houses in the area were used as places for congregational prayers in public. Planning for the establishment of the site was also done concurrently with Masjid Al-Istiqamah, another mosque in the Serangoon planning area. In 1997, the place where the proposed mosque would be built was confirmed by officials at the MUIS to be a plot of land situated along Pasir Ris Drive 3.

Masjid Al-Istighfar was completed on 16 July 1999 and was opened to the public for Friday prayers on the same day. The official opening ceremony for the mosque, however, was held on 30 July of the same year. Then on 16 April 2000, Lee Hsien Loong, at the time serving as Deputy Prime Minister of Singapore, visited Masjid Al-Istighfar and conducted a dialogue there with leaders of the local Malay Muslim community. The mosque was also closed down during a nationwide mosque closure as part of safety measures during the COVID-19 pandemic but was later reopened after the pandemic had ended.

== Architecture ==
The appearance of Masjid Al-Istighfar is modelled after the Blue Mosque of Istanbul. The main building of the mosque has three floors and has a capacity of 3,000 worshippers. The mosque has a blue onion dome on a drum that tops the main prayer hall, with a minaret overlooking the whole complex, while all of the architectural elements are modelled in the style of Ottoman architecture. Attached to the walls of the mosque are a set of water coolers which are for the public to use.

== Transportation ==
Masjid Al-Istighfar is accessible from the Pasir Ris Bus Interchange.

== See also ==
- Masjid Alkaff Upper Serangoon
- List of mosques in Singapore
