= Kembangan MRT station =

Mass Rapid Transit station in Singapore

Kembangan EW6 景万岸 கெம்பாங்கான்
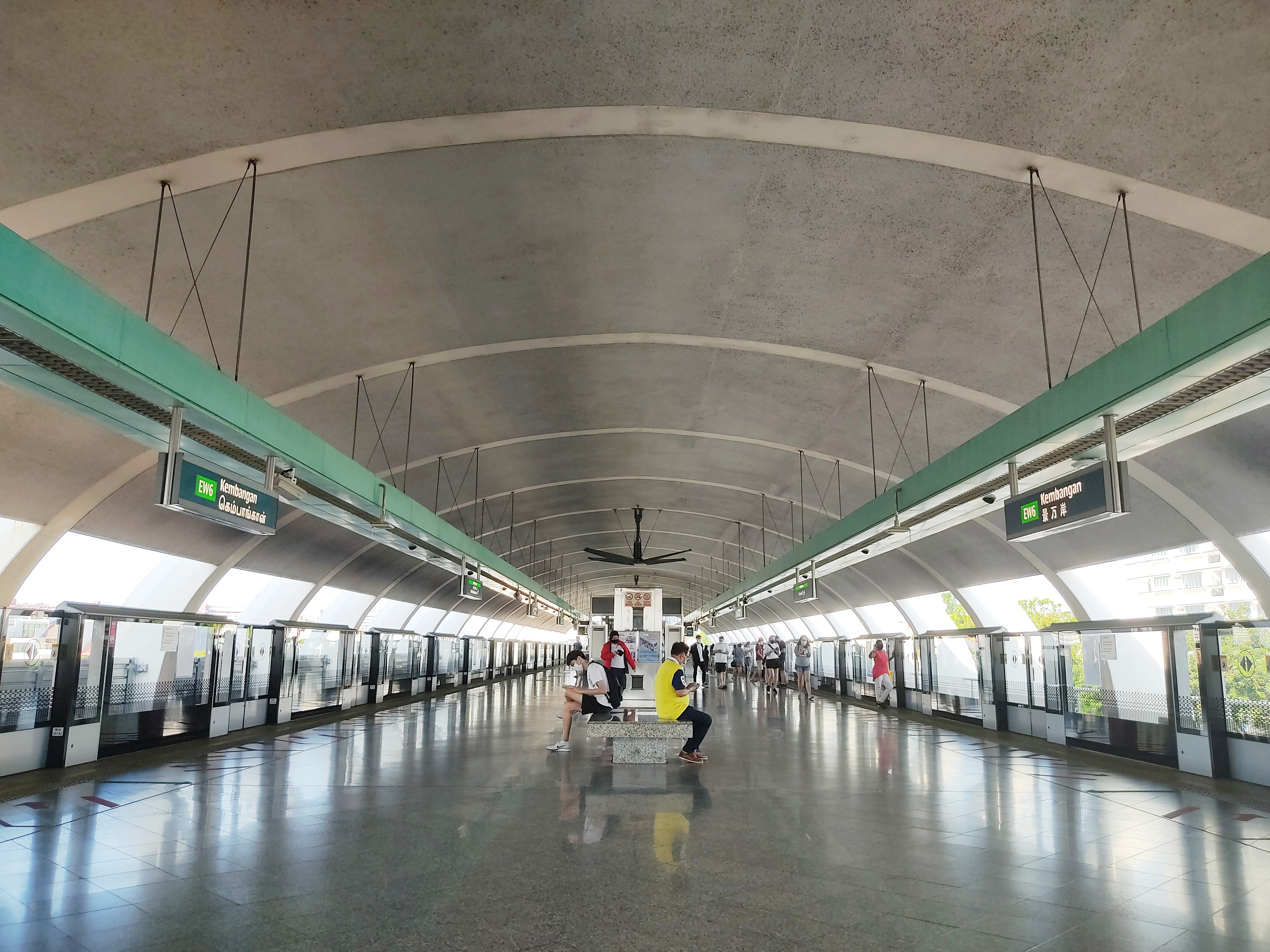
- Platform level of Kembangan MRT station

General information
- Location: 55 Sims Avenue East; Singapore 416551
- Coordinates: 1°19′16″N 103°54′48″E
- System: Mass Rapid Transit (MRT) station
- Owner: Land Transport Authority (LTA)
- Operator: SMRT Trains
- Line: East–West Line
- Platforms: 2 (1 island platform)
- Tracks: 2
- Connections: Bus, taxi

Construction
- Structure type: Elevated
- Platform levels: 1
- Cycle facilities: Yes
- Accessible: Yes

History
- Opened: 4 November 1989; 37 years ago
- Closed: 21 and 28 January 2018; 8 years ago (Note: Track works and testing for a new signalling system.)
- Former names: Frankel

Passengers
- June 2024: 9762 per day

Services
Preceding station	Mass Rapid Transit	Following station
Bedok towards Pasir Ris	East–West Line	Eunos towards Tuas Link
Track layout
Location
- Location within Singapore Rail

Kembangan MRT station (/kəmˈbɑːŋɑːn/ kəm-BAHNG-ahn) is an elevated Mass Rapid Transit (MRT) station on the East–West Line (EWL) in Bedok, Singapore. Operated by SMRT Trains, the station serves the eponymous Kembangan subzone of Bedok. Other nearby landmarks include the Kembangan Community Club and the Masjid Kassim.

First announced in May 1982 as Frankel, the station was constructed as part of Phase II of the MRT system. The name was later changed in 1983. Kampongs Kembangan and Pachitan were acquired for the station's construction. It commenced operations on 17 December 1989 along with the other stations on the Tanah Merah–Pasir Ris Stations stretch. Half-height platform screen doors and high-volume low-speed fans were installed by August 2011 and the first quarter of 2013, respectively.

Like many stations of the EWL eastern stretch, the station has a dome-shaped segmented roof. As a part of a heritage-themed art exhibition, there are two murals by students from St. Joseph's Institution displayed in the station, which details the history of nearby landmarks.

== History ==
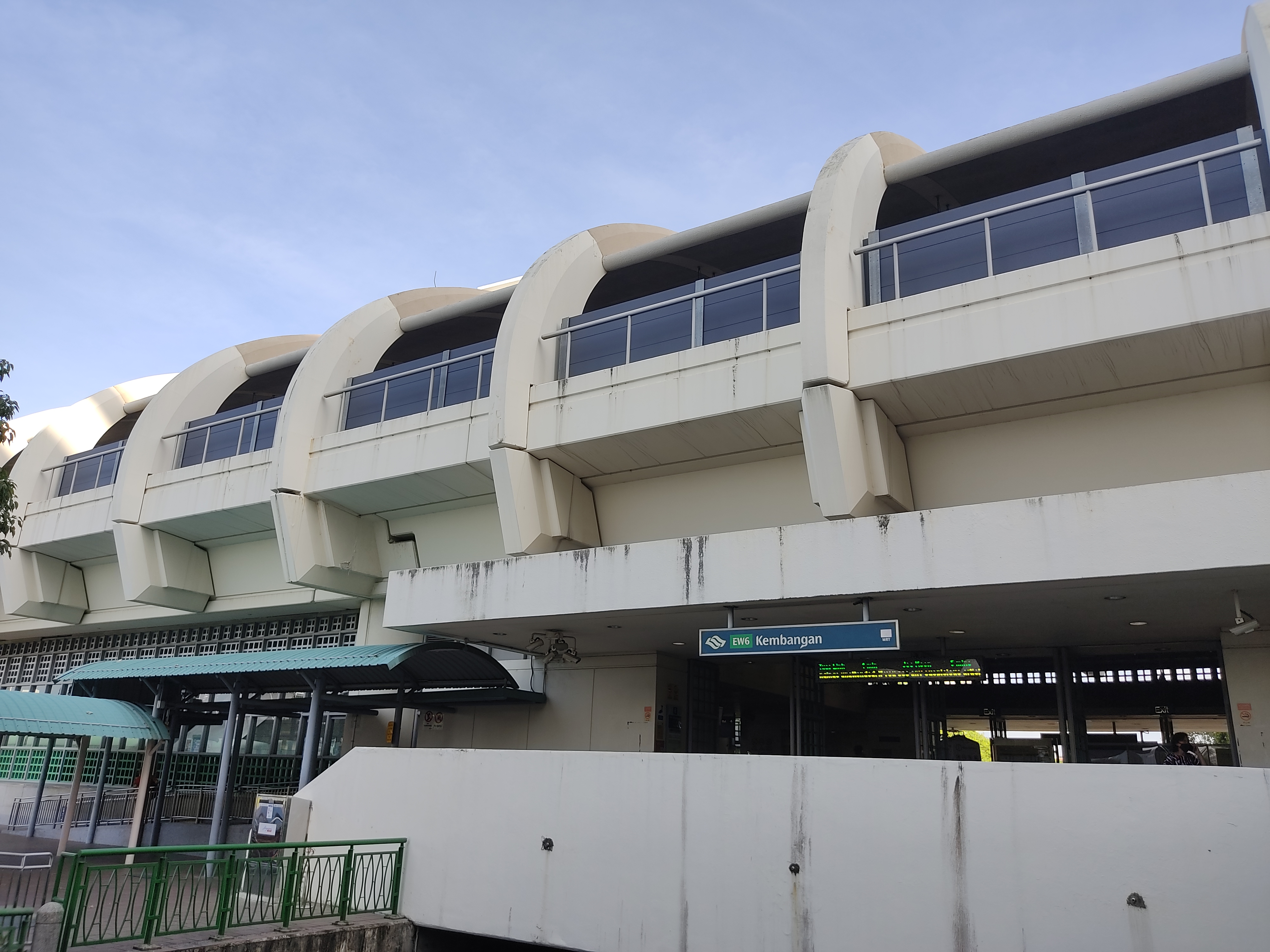
The exterior of Kembangan station

The Mass Rapid Transit (MRT) system was conceptualised in a 1971 study conducted by the Singapore Government and the United Nations Development Programme. The study – which assessed land-use transportation needs – concluded that Singapore would need a rail transit system by 1992. Further studies and debates on the feasibility of building a rapid transit system took place from 1972 to 1980, with Chai Chee station appearing in initial plans by May 1982. Frankel was proposed to be constructed as part of the 32.6 kilometres (20.3 mi) East–West Line (EWL), which was to have 22 stations and run from Jurong West to Bedok. On 30 May 1982, communications minister Ong Teng Cheong confirmed that the government approved construction of the MRT; Frankel station was renamed to Kembangan by October 1983. The system was planned to be constructed in three phases, with Kembangan part of "Phase II", which was 32.6 kilometres (20.3 mi) long and composed of 22 stations. (Note: Although previous studies concluded that the EWL should be constructed first, the government chose to construct the North–South Line (NSL) first, another line proposed in those studies, though The Straits Times noted that this would not imply that the NSL would have to be built first before the EWL can begin construction.) Phase II would be constructed in different sections, with Kembangan specifically part of "Phase IIA", which consisted of 13 stations from City Hall to Pasir Ris. Stations under Phase II were planned to start construction while Phase I stations are under construction to ensure that the MRT would be fully open by the early 1990s.

From May to June 1984, the Mass Rapid Transit Corporation (MRTC) called for the prequalification of consultants to design the civil, architectural, and structural works for Phase IIA stations. Ten companies were shortlisted by July, and the contract was awarded to an American–Singapore consortium between De Leuw Cather, Wilbur Smith & Associates, Skidmore Owings Merrill, and Singaporean firm RSP Architects in October for S$11.5 million (1984) (US$5.39 million). The Straits Times reported in November that Phase II was ahead of schedule by two years due to the successful timing for Phase I. By May 1985, there were several tenderers shortlisted for Contracts 303 and 304: seven prequalified for Contract 303, which covered the construction of viaducts from Eunos station to Kembangan station, while seven were prequalified for Contract 304, which covered the construction of Kembangan and Bedok stations. Ultimately, Contract 303 was awarded to a Japanese–Singaporean joint venture between Okumura Corporation and Oh Teck Thye for S$60 million (1985) (US$27.27 million) in December 1985 while Contract 304 was awarded to a partnership between Obayashi Corporation and Resources Development Pte Ltd for S$70 million (1986) (US$32.15 million) in January 1986.

Construction of Kembangan station began in March 1986. To construct the station, Kampongs Kembangan and Pachitan were acquired. The subcontract for the supply of post-tension cables and pre-cast beams for the viaducts was awarded to Swiss company VSL Systems in July 1986. On 30 December 1986, the joint venture for Contract 303 was terminated, with Okumura taking over the project. It was later disclosed that Oh Teck Thye was placed under receivership when it failed to repay its debts. Although stations in the City Hall–Changi stretch were initially expected to commence operations by December 1989, The Straits Times reported in February 1989 that Phase IIA was ahead of schedule and could commence operations in the last quarter of the year. Civil works for Kembangan station were fully completed by April 1989 and from August, test runs were conducted on the City Hall–Tanah Merah (Note: Changi station was renamed to Tanah Merah in March 1987.) stretch to check the trains and tracks. By then, communications minister Yeo Ning Hong announced that stations within the City Hall–Tanah Merah stretch would open on 18 November, though the opening date was moved to 4 November in September as the test runs were ahead of schedule. Kembangan, along with other stations between Marina Bay and Tanah Merah, opened on 4 November 1989.

On 22 March 1997, a man jumped in front of an oncoming west-bound train, where he sustained head, arm, and foot injuries. The man was pronounced dead afterwards. Train services between Eunos and Tanah Merah stations were disrupted for two hours. Following an increase in track intrusions, the Land Transport Authority (LTA) and SMRT decided to install platform screen doors at all elevated MRT stations. After several successful tests at different stations, works to install half-height platform screen doors were expected to start in 2010; they were installed at Kembangan station by August 2011. High-volume low-speed fans were installed in the station by the first quarter of 2013.

== Details ==
Kembangan station is on the EWL with the station code of EW6, situated between Bedok and Eunos station. Under the New Rail Financing Framework, it is owned by the Land Transport Authority. The station had the code E6 at opening and received its current station code in August 2001 as part of a system-wide campaign to cater to the expanding MRT system. The station is elevated and like many stations on the initial MRT network, has an island platform configuration. As part of the EWL, Eunos is operated by SMRT Trains. The station operates around 5:40 am to 12:30 am daily, with train frequencies varying from 2 to 5 minutes.

Kembangan is a two-story, elevated station. The station's concourse, 1 metre (3.3 ft) above ground, has a ticketing office and the electrical and mechanical plant rooms whilst its platforms are 8.5 metres (28 ft) above the concourse and are built in the island platform configuration. Both floors are column-free, with the platforms intended to give commuters ease of movement. The station runs alongside Sims Avenue East and has two exits serving amenities in the area such as Kampong Kembangan Community Club (Kembangan CC), Masjid Kassim, and Bethesda Chapel. It is also wheelchair-accessible and has bicycle facilities.

Similar to most Phase IIA stations, Bedok has a dome-shaped roof. (Note: The exception is Eunos, which has a traditional Malay-style roof.) The roof – which spans 23 metres (75 ft) across the platform and tracks – is made of a 7 metres (23 ft) high parabolic arched canopy supported by 25 precast concrete ribs at 6.25 metres (20.5 ft) centres, with a 150 millimetres (5.9 in) thick roof slab between the ribs. The design was an attempt by the MRT Corporation (MRTC) to give the stations on the EWL an "attractive look", with The Straits Times comparing it to a caterpillar in one article and a rib cage in another article. Additionally, as a part of SMRT's heritage-themed artwork showcase Comic Connect, the station features two murals created by students from St. Joseph's Institution. The first mural depicts the Church of Our Lady of Perpetual Succour (OLPS) and Kembangan CC while the second mural depicts Masjid Kassim and the site of the Buddhist Union. The creation process took 10 months, with the mural unveiled in February 2024.
