= Madrasah Al-Arabiah Al-Islamiah =

Religious school in Singapore

- مدرسة العربية الإسلامية

Location
- 3 Lorong 6 Toa Payoh; Singapore 319378; Singapore
- Coordinates: 1.3374°N 103.8524°E

Information
- Type: Islamic, secondary
- Motto: الإيمان و العلم و العمل; Iman, Ilmu, Amal (Faith, Knowledge, Deeds)
- Established: 1946
- Session: Single session
- Principal: Ms Aisha Manaf (Acting Principal)
- Area: Toa Payoh
- Colours: Green, White
- Affiliations: Madrasah Aljunied Al-Islamiah Madrasah Al-Irsyad Al-Islamiah
- Website: mai.sg

Madrasah Al-Arabiah Al-Islamiah is a full-time co-educational madrasah offering secondary school education in Singapore. Madrasah is an Arabic word that means "school" but in the present context a madrasah means an Islamic religious school.

Like the five other full-time madrasahs in Singapore (Aljuneid Al-Islamiah, Alsagoff Al-Arabiah, Irsyad Zuhri Al-Islamiah, Al-Maarif Al-Islamiah and Madrasah Wak Tanjong Al-Islamiah), Madrasah Al-Arabiah Al-Islamiah (MAI) is a private school which offers students an education comprising both ukhrawi (Islamic religious) subjects such as Arabic and Revelation studies, as well as duniawi (secular) subjects like English, Mathematics and Science. MAI's students take both secular and ukhrawi national exams. Many of its graduates move on to further their studies in Islamic Universities overseas and return to become asatizahs (religious teachers), while others attend the local polytechnics and universities. The school is currently operating at its campus at Lorong 6 Toa Payoh.

== History ==
Madrasah Al-Arabiah Al-Islamiah was founded in the 1930s along Hillside Drive near Upper Serangoon beside Masjid Haji Yusoff. It was however only in 1946 that it was registered with the state authorities. In 1965, the Madrasah Management Committee was formed to raise funds for the upgrading of the madrasah, but despite raising insufficient funds the madrasah continued giving back to the neighbouring community. On 26 July 1982, the madrasah was destroyed by a fire, but a class of 17 students returned in spite of the situation to continue schooling. Later in the 1980s the school moved to a new site in Kembangan, along Jalan Selamat, where the Muhammadiyah Association building now stands. In 2005, the madrasah moved again to a larger facility along Lorong 13 Geylang, but it unfortunately still didn't have ample facilities like science labs and thus students had to visit other madrasahs to use them. In 2007, the madrasah joined the Joint Madrasah System (JMS) together with Madrasah Al-Irsyad Al-Islamiah and Madrasah Aljunied Al-Islamiah, and switched to offering only secondary education, the system is similar to the affiliation of certain mainstream primary and secondary schools, but is to essentially get around the problem of having limited funds and to raise the performance of students. In 2009, the madrasah moved yet again to its current location in Toa Payoh, which is a temporary location at the site of the former Poi Ching School. In 2020, moved again this time to a permanent location next to its current location in Toa Payoh where the site of the former Pei Chun Public School used to be located. The new campus is expected to have new classrooms, laboratories and a multipurpose hall, and more.

== Curriculum ==
MAI students take the GCE 'O' and/or 'N(A)' Level Examinations at the end of either 4 or 5 years in the madrasah. This would prepare students for higher level examinations in either the Junior Colleges or Polytechnics or other institutes of higher education when they leave the madrasah. Students will sit for a minimum of 7 or a maximum of 9 subjects, of which they include subjects such as languages, sciences, humanities, Islamic studies and life skills. MAI has also adopted the Ministry of Education (MOE) iSTEM programme, with an emphasis on science education. Service learning would also be part of the curriculum in MAI, with opportunities to take part in local and overseas projects. As with other educational institutes, MAI has both financial assistance and scholarship schemes for its students, and opportunities for its top performing students to partake in special programmes.

== See also ==
- Islam in Singapore
- Madrasahs in Singapore
