= Masjid Haji Yusoff =

Mosque located in Hougang, Singapore

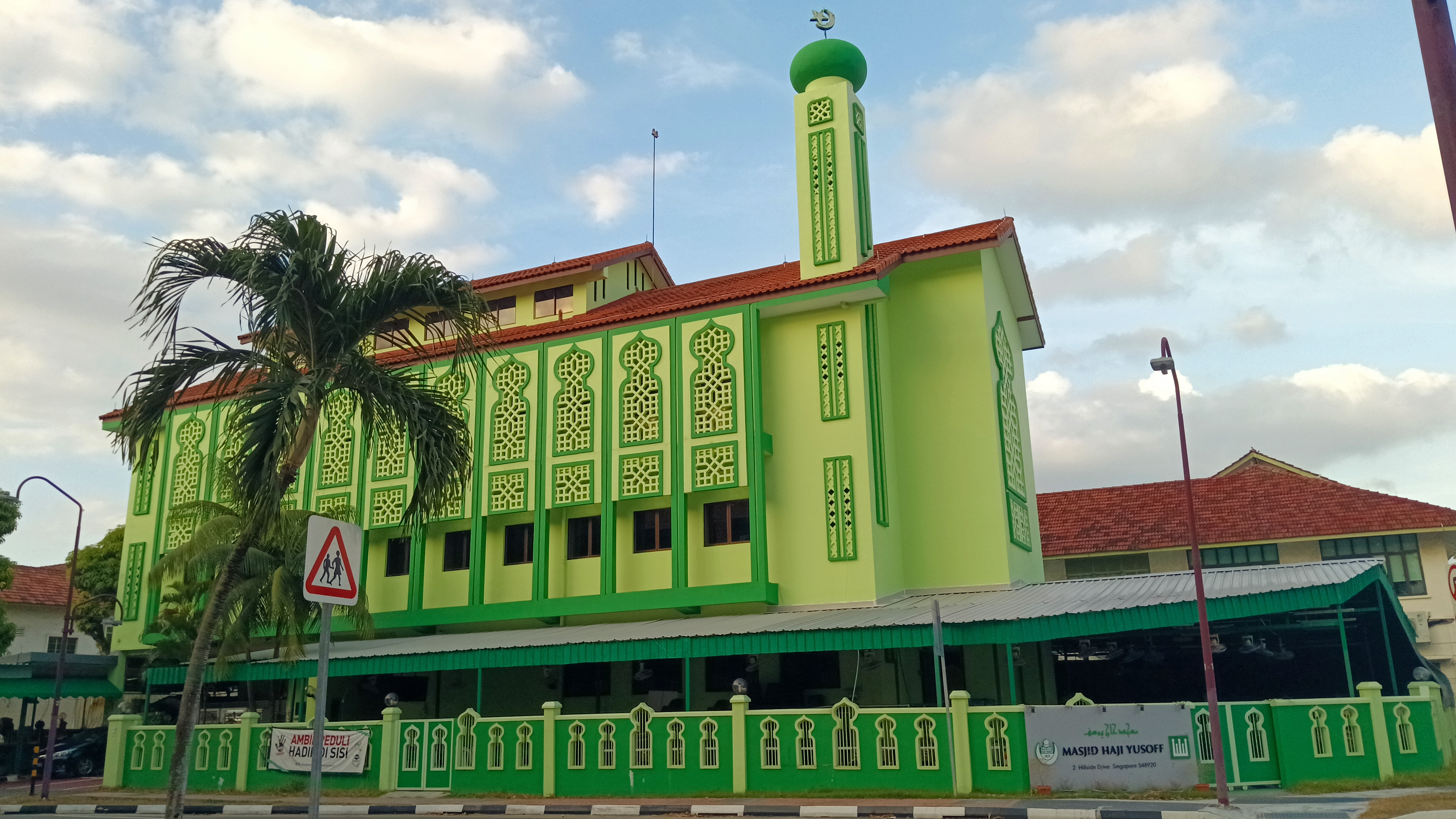

- Location in Singapore

Religion
- Affiliation: Sunni Islam

Location
- Location: 2 Hillside Drive, Singapore 548920
- Country: Singapore
- Coordinates: 1.3556540°N 103.8796793°E

Architecture
- Type: Mosque
- Style: Malay architecture
- Founder: Ahmad Mohammed Salleh Angullia
- Completed: 1921; 1990s (Reconstruction)
- Minaret: 1

Masjid Haji Yusoff (Jawi: مسجد الحاج يوسف; transliterated: Masjid al-Ḥājji Yūsuf) is a mosque located off Upper Serangoon Road in Hougang, Singapore. Built in 1921 and completely reconstructed in the 1990s, the mosque is named after its main benefactor, Haji Eusoff. It was also the former campus of Madrasah Al-Arabiah Al-Islamiah until after 1982.

== History ==
The mosque was built in 1921 by Mohammed Salleh Eusoff Angullia, a Gujarati Muslim merchant and qāḍī, known by his Malay title "Haji Eusoff." He donated a large sum of money and a plot of land along Hillside Drive, both as awqāf to build a mosque. It was the first mosque to be built in the Hougang area, followed only by Masjid En-Naeem in 1983. The mosque formerly housed a madrasa, Madrasah Al-Arabiah Al-Islamiah, which was temporarily relocated to Kembangan after a fire in 1982 destroyed the school completely; afterwards the campus was then permanently moved to Toa Payoh, where it still stands.

Due to the small size of the mosque, plans were formed in the 1980s to expand the mosque to accommodate the increasing Muslim population in Hougang. In 1981, the mosque received a $260,000 donation from the Muslim World League which helped to fund the planned reconstruction. Later that year, an anonymous donor from Sabah donated $40,000 to help the reconstruction project. The mosque was rebuilt throughout the 1990s as a three-storey structure, replacing its domes with a larger minaret.

The mosque was regarded as a heritage monument of the Hougang neighbourhood, due to its status as the first mosque in the area. The mosque was also popular amongst Chinese locals, who named it "Sembahyang Tng," a fusion of Malay and Hokkien words respectively which when combined translates into "Prayer Pagoda."

== Architecture ==
Masjid Haji Yusoff is built in a traditional Malay architectural style, which is evident from the brown, tiered roof. The mosque has only one minaret, while the main building of the mosque is composed of three stories; two of them being prayer halls, one for the male worshippers and one for the female worshippers, while an additional basement is located below. The present-day structure is drastically different from the original 1921 structure, which was a square building with a tiered roof that was topped by a large dome, akin to Masjid Hussain Sulaiman at Pasir Panjang.

== Gallery ==
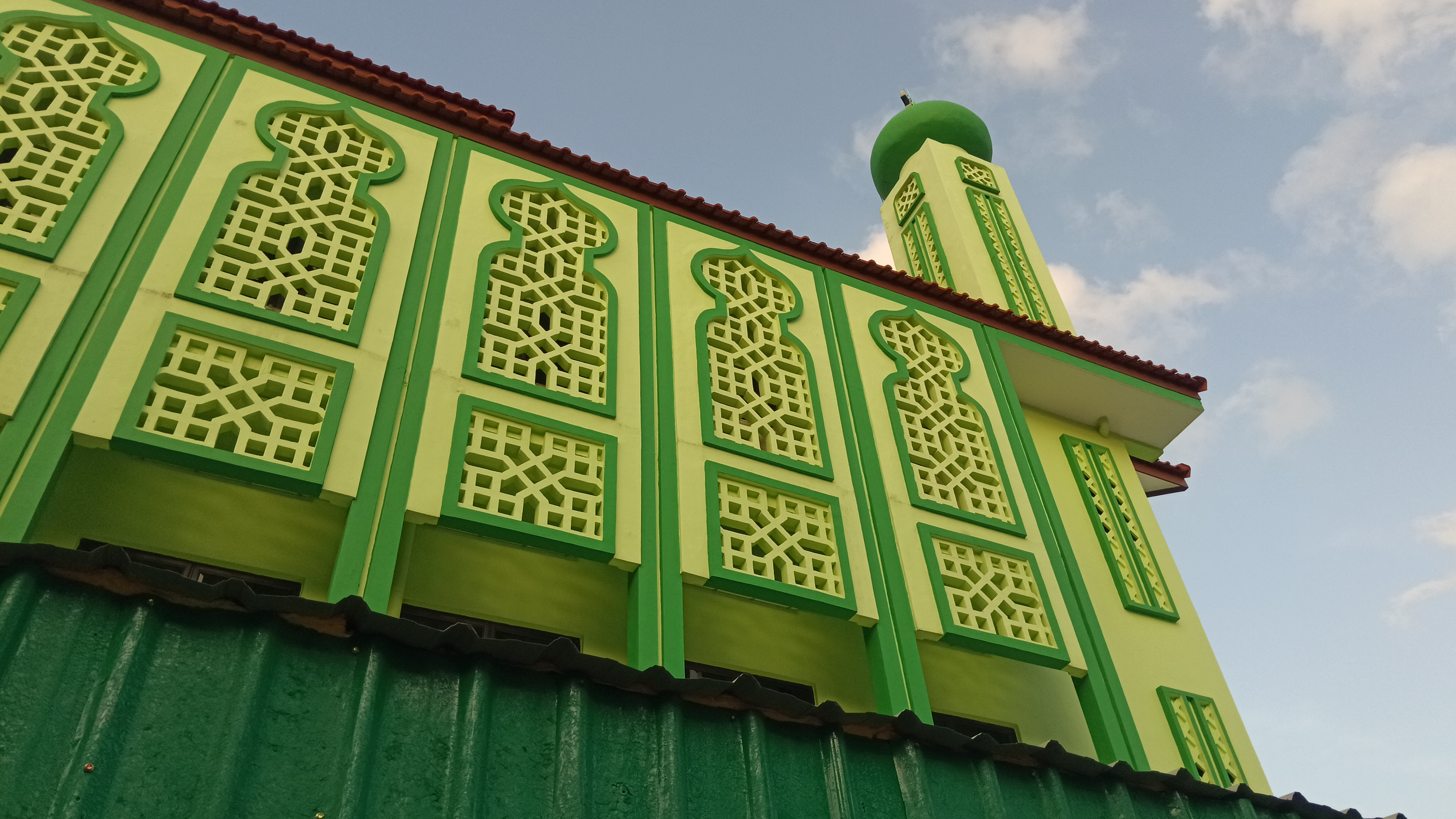
Arched carvings on the side of the mosque building.

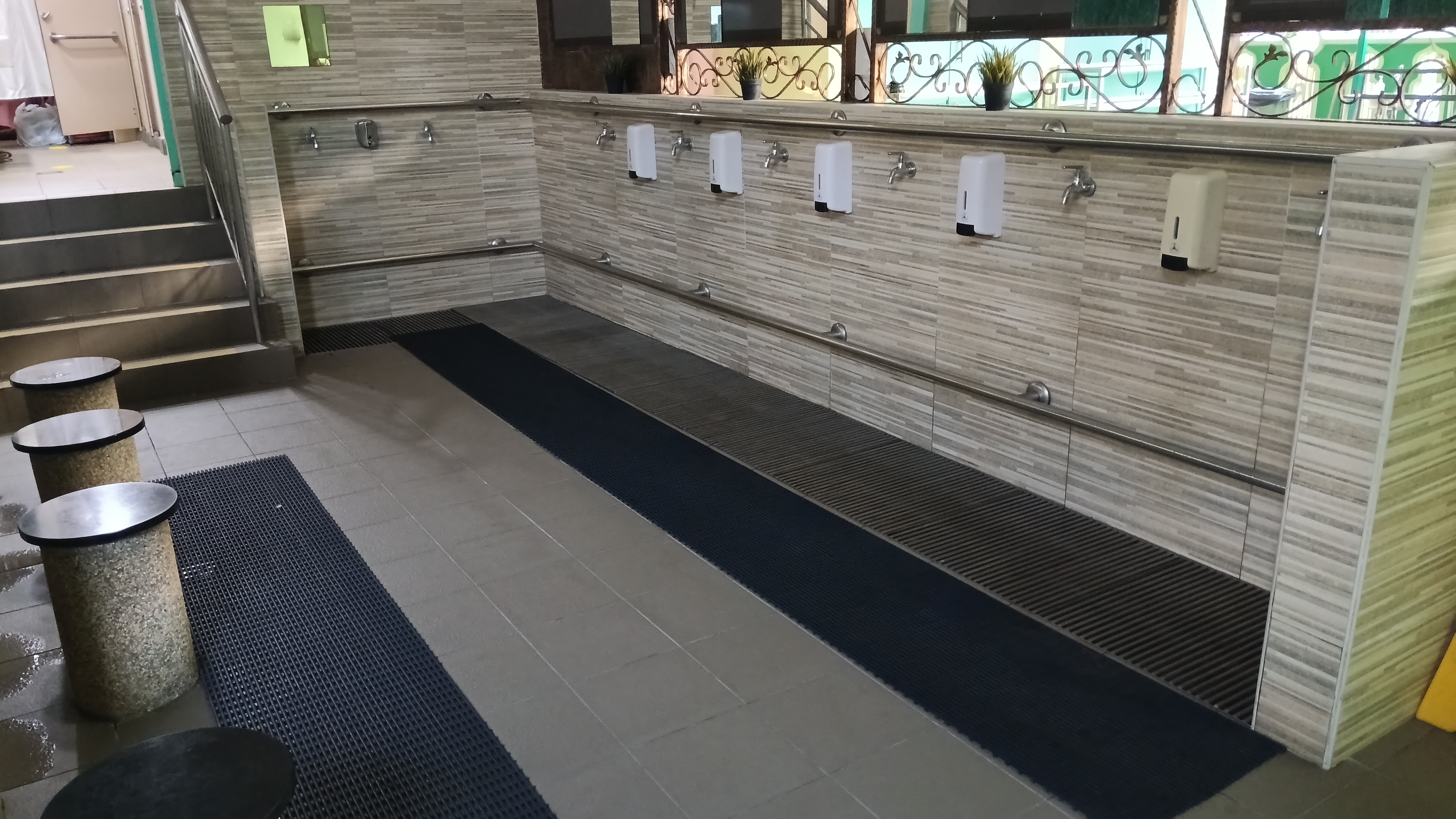
The place of worshippers to take their wudhu.

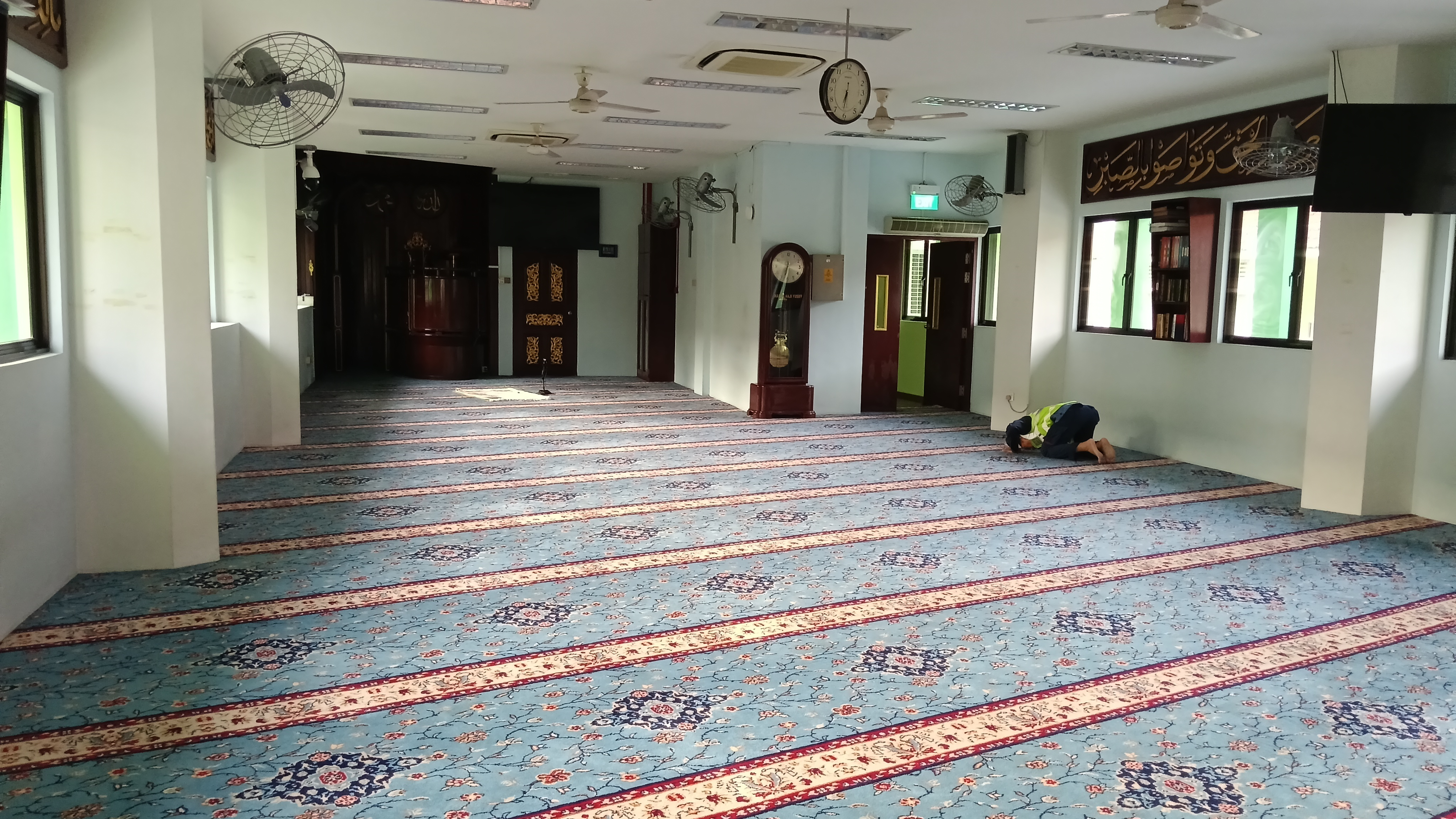
The main prayer hall of the mosque, located on the second level.

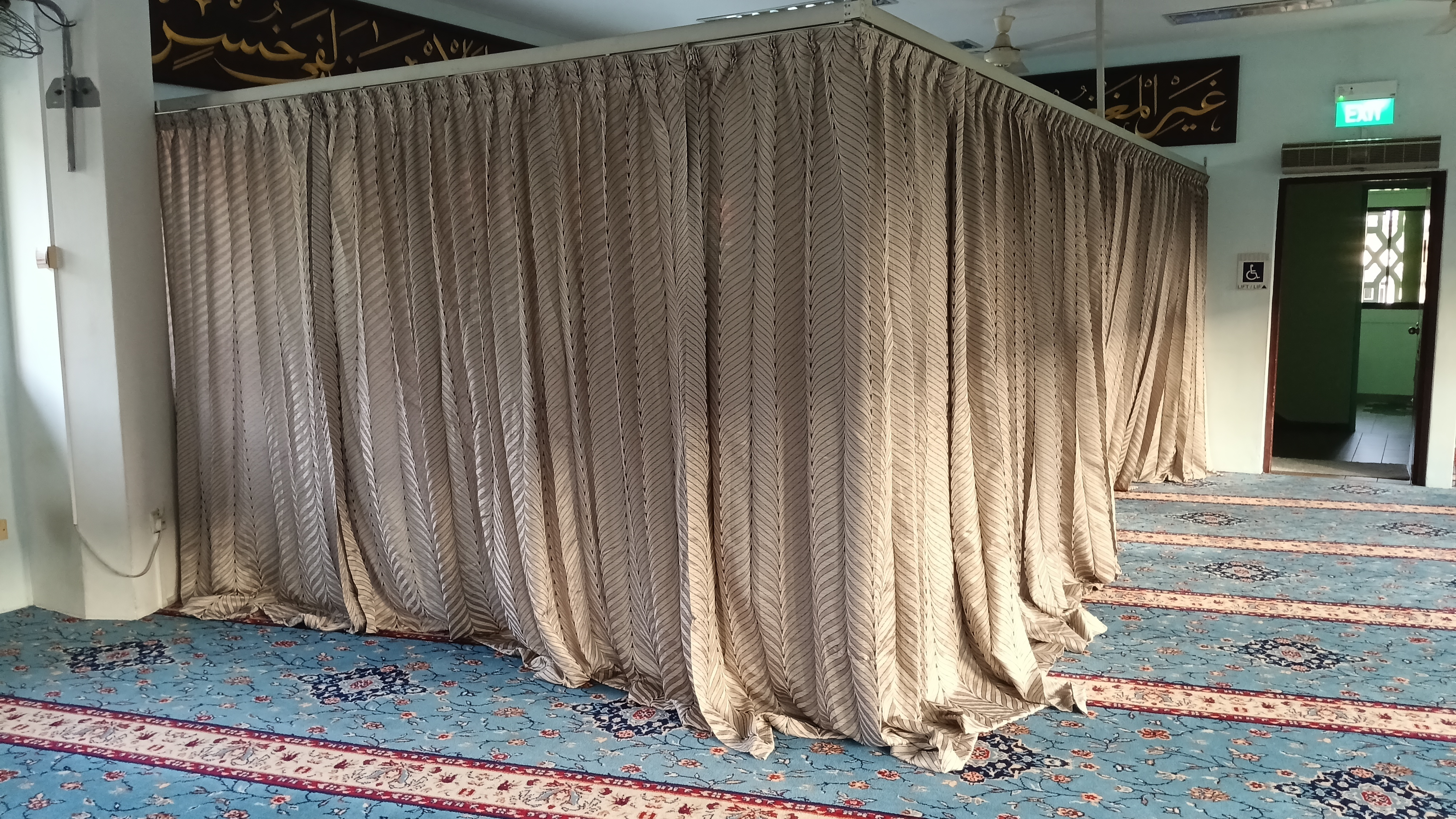
Part of the prayer hall reserved for female worshippers.

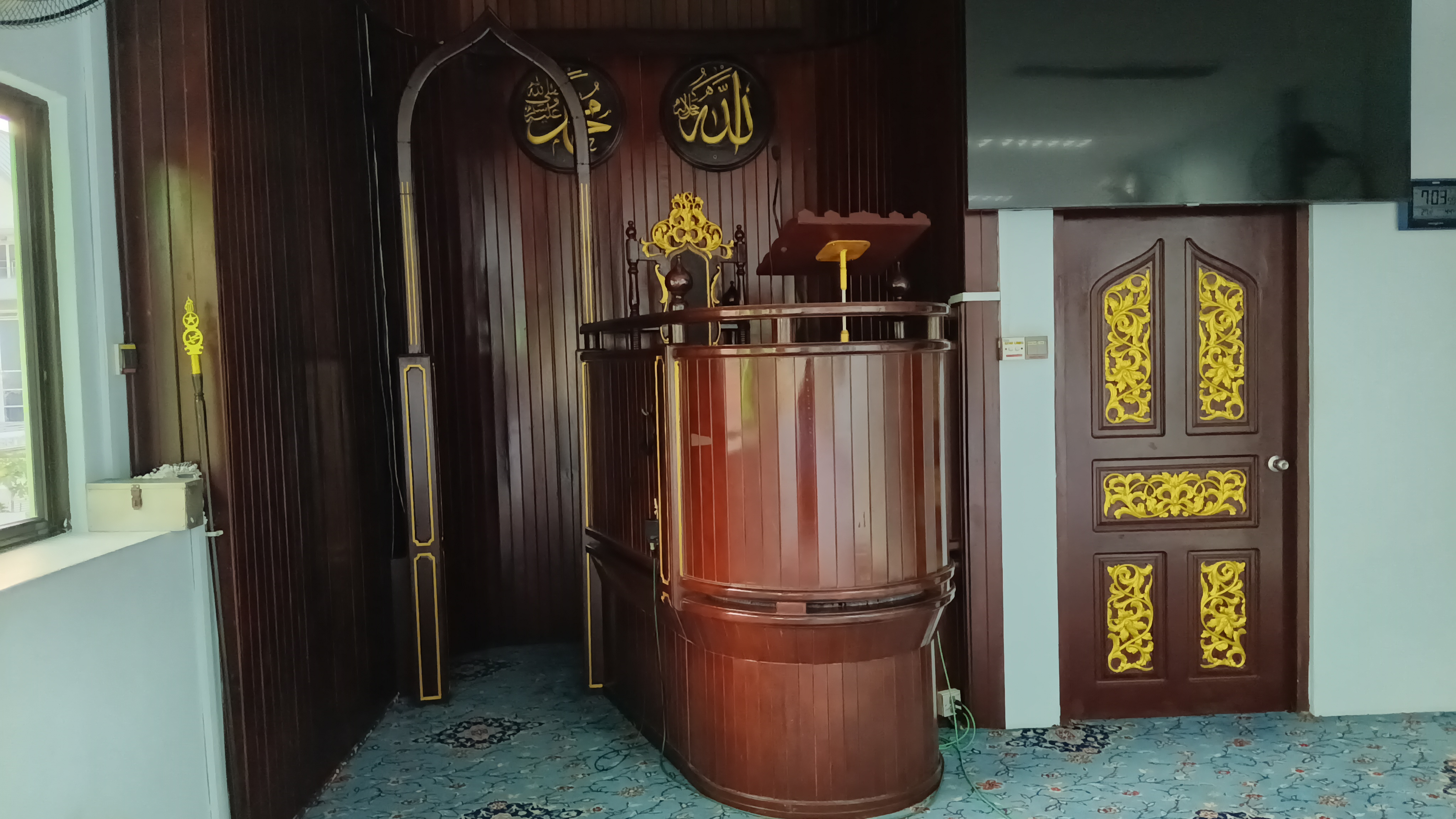
The mihrab and the minbar (pulpit).

== See also ==
- Masjid Hajjah Rahimabi Kebun Limau
- List of mosques in Singapore
