= Madrasah Al-Maarif Al-Islamiah =

Islamic girls school in Singapore

Madrasah Al-Ma'arif Al-Islamiah
- مدرسة المعارف الإسلامية

Location
- 3 Lorong 39 Geylang; Singapore 387865; Singapore
- Coordinates: 1.3152°N 103.8884°E

Information
- Type: Independent, madrasah
- Motto: الصبر والاستقامة أساسا النجاح (Patience and consistency are keys to success)
- Founded: 1936
- Founder: Syeikh Muhammad Fadlullah Suhaimi
- Session: Single session
- Principal: Maisarah Kasim
- Years: Primary 1 – Pre-University
- Gender: Girls
- Age: 7 to 18
- Area: Paya Lebar
- Colours: Pink, White
- Website: Official website

Madrasah Al-Ma'arif Al-Islamiah is an all-girls' Islamic school, commonly known as madrasah, in Singapore. Al-Ma'arif has students at primary, secondary and pre-university levels. It is one of six full-time Islamic madrasahs in Singapore. Unlike most of the other madrasahs, Al-Ma'arif's curriculum places equal emphasis on Islamic religious studies and secular subjects from the Singapore Ministry of Education curriculum.

Like other madrasahs in Singapore, Al-Ma'arif has a Management Committee whose members are appointed every two years by the Ministry of Education in consultation with the Majlis Ugama Islam Singapura (MUIS).

== History ==
=== Early years ===
Al-Maarif was established in 1936 by Syeikh Muhammad Fadhlullah Suhaimi, a strong and progressive advocate of education for girls. Al-Maarif's reformist ideals were immediately apparent by its inclusion of non-religious subjects into its curricula. Al-Maarif was also the first madrasah to accept female students as well as male. Today, Al-Maarif is one of the only two madrasahs that offer madrasah education exclusively to girls. It was later noted that founder Fadhlullah Suhaimi's son Kamil himself exemplified his father's reformist ideals—by studying jurisprudence at Al-Azhar University and then law at Lincoln's Inn in London—before returning to contribute as a lawyer and religious leader.

Associate Professor Khairudin and Dayang Hussin postulated that Al-Maarif represented a new breed of madrasahs imbibing aspects of Islamic reformist ideals and accordingly, represented the beginning of formal Muslim education. They wrote:

The structure of this madrassah was generally characterized by its systematic organization, such as fixed curriculum period, division of educational levels into primary and secondary, as well as existence of facilities such as chairs and tables for students. As for the enhancement of intellectual tradition, the madrassah incorporated other ‘non-religious’ subjects, such as mathematics and science (and other subjects depending on respective madrassah) in addition to subjects on Islam.

=== Contemporary Years ===
In line with its reformist ideals, Al-Ma'arif was the first madrasah to prepare its students to sit for the GCE, the equivalent of today's GCE 'O' Level examinations, in the 1960s, and then the GCE 'A' Level examinations in the 1970s. This shift, whilst revolutionary, was made in the belief that madrasah students must master both religious and secular subjects.

== Notable alumni ==
- Dinah Aziz, the first madrasah student to score seven A1s in the 'O' Level examinations in 2008. She was featured in a book titled '50 Defining Moments For The Malay/Muslim Community'.
- Amalina Ridzuan, one of the two madrasah students who were offered places in the highly competitive Yong Loo Lin School of Medicine in National University of Singapore for the first time in 2015. The other is Ahmad Abdurrahman, a graduate of Madrasah Aljunied Al-Islamiah.

== See also ==
- Islam in Singapore
- Madrasahs in Singapore
