= Madrasah Alsagoff Al-Arabiah =

- مدرسة السقاف العربية
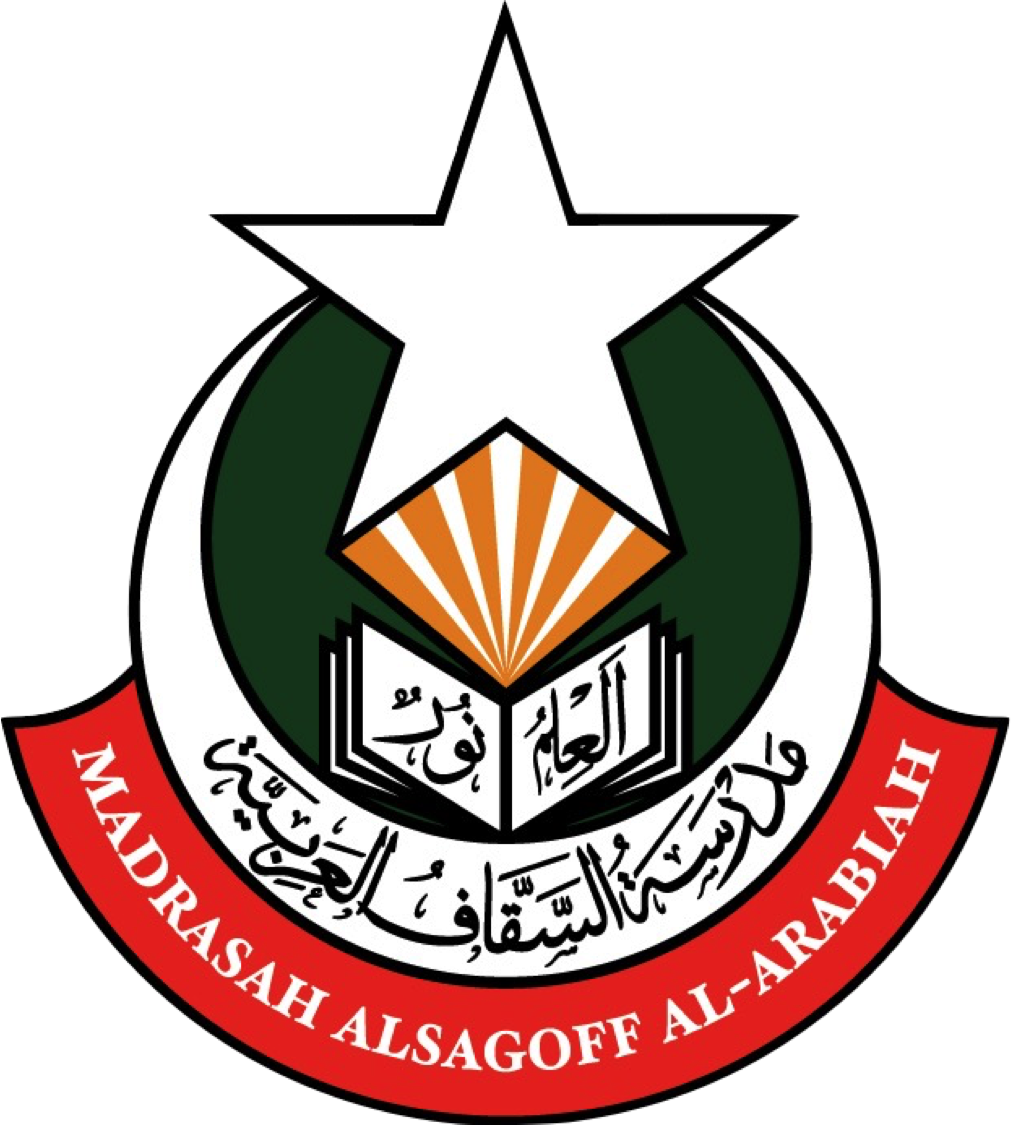

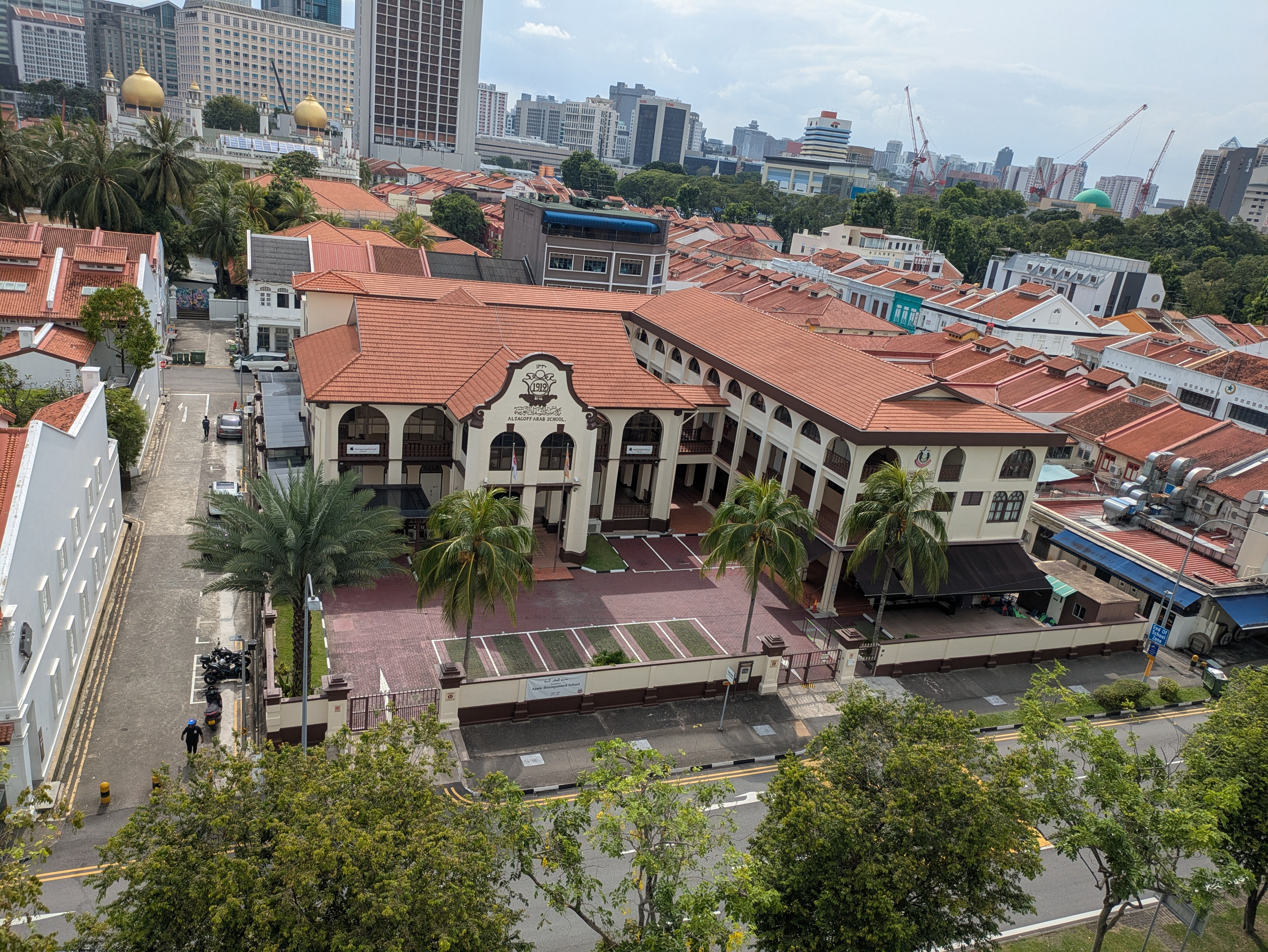

Location
- 111 Jalan Sultan; 199006; Singapore
- Coordinates: 1.30347°N 103.86078°E

Information
- Other name: Alsagoff Arab School
- Type: Madrasah
- Motto: “In Allah We Trust, With Allah We will Be, For Allah We Shall Serve, Amin”
- Religious affiliation: Islam
- Established: 1912; 114 years ago
- Founder: Syed Mohamed bin Syed Ahmad Alsagoff
- Principal: Syed Mustafa bin Syed Jaafar Alsagoff
- Grades: Primary 1 to Pre-University 2
- Gender: Female
- Age: 7 to 18
- Colours: White and gold
- Website: alsagoff.edu.sg

Madrasah Alsagoff Al-Arabiah is one of the six full-time Madrasahs in Singapore recognised by Majlis Ugama Islam Singapura (MUIS). It is known for its academic emphasis on its language and religious subjects.

The architectural design of the school is partly influenced by the Dutch-Indies, and also reflects the local culture and climate. Alsagoff is recognised as one of Singapore's heritage schools.

== History ==
Alsagoff was founded in accordance to the will of Syed Mohamed bin Syed Ahmad Alsagoff in 1912. It is therefore the oldest madrasah in Singapore.

Alsagoff was first established as an all-boys school. In the 1940s, Alsagoff began taking in female students as well, albeit in a separate school session, making it a co-ed school. When the number of male students started to decrease, Alsagoff stopped taking in boys, making it an all-girls school.

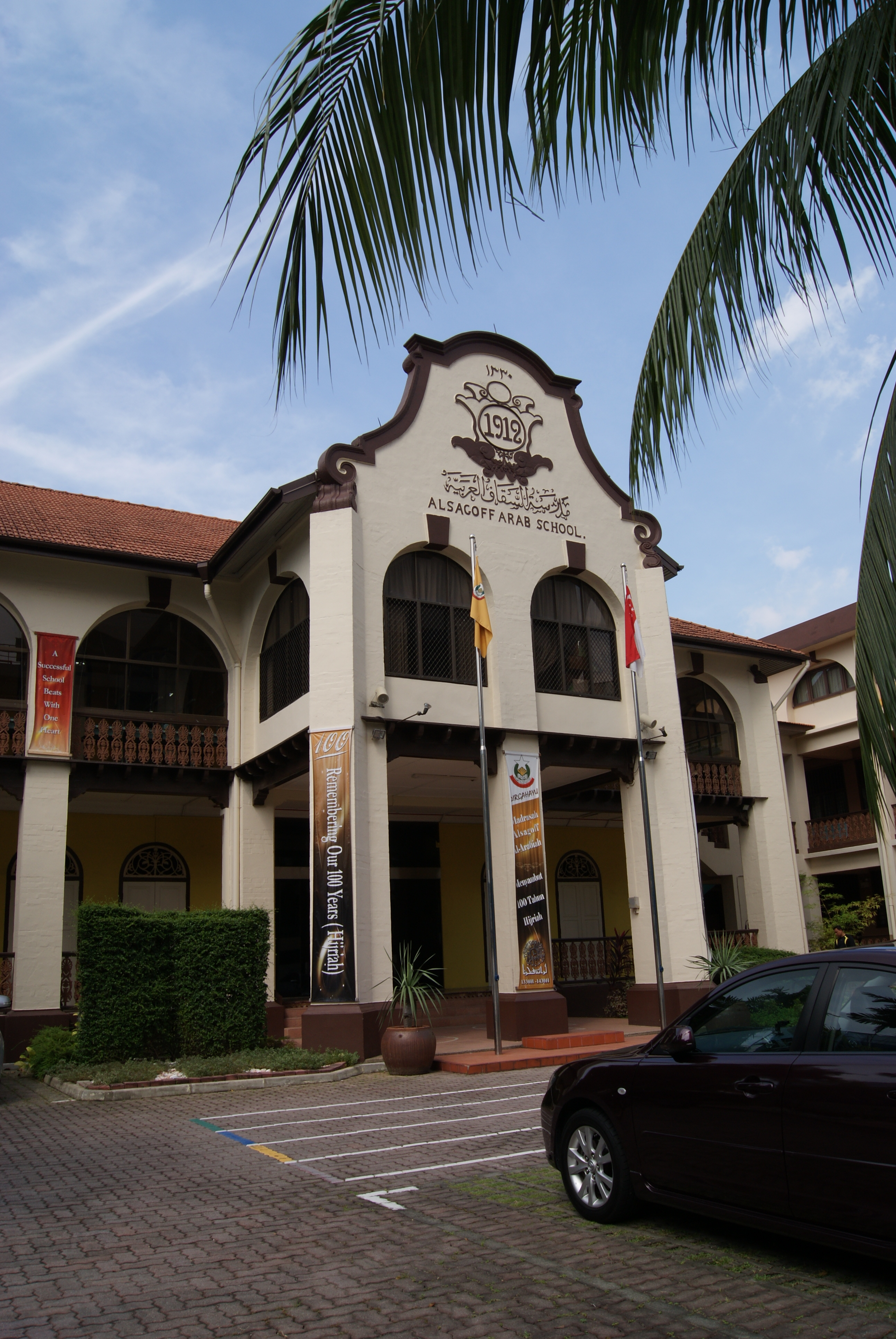
Foyer of Alsagoff Al-Arabiah

== Curriculum ==
Alsagoff places great emphasis on the Arabic language. Arabic is the medium language in almost all religious subjects and students are encouraged to speak in Arabic during these lessons. It also offers other academic and language (English and Malay) subjects. Students can participate in various co-curricular activities catered for different levels.

== Notable alumni ==
- Dato Seri Setia Dr. Haji Pengiran Mohammad Bin Pengiran Haji Abdul Rahman, Brunei's Minister of Religious Affairs.
