= NUS Muslim Society =

The National University of Singapore Muslim Society (NUSMS), which used to be called the University of Singapore Muslim Society (USMS) or Persatuan Mahasiswa Islam Universiti Singapura (PMIUS), was established in 1964 to provide a platform for students and staff to engage in activities that serve the Muslim community on campus. It is a student-run organisation registered with the Registry of Societies and is currently managed by the 62nd Executive Committee (ExCo).

Some of the society's organised initiatives have included Iftar (breaking of the Muslim fast during Ramadan), sports events, night cycling, freshmen orientation camp, Youth Expedition Projects, and Islamic Awareness events. It had published few publications namely Sedar (1978-1980) and Fount Journal. A group of National University of Singapore undergraduates under the umbrella of the National University of Singapore Muslim Society also initiated APEX Programme at Madrasah Al-Irsyad Al-Islamiah among others.

It is part of the Community Engagement Program (CEP) Network that was set up to promote awareness and understanding of the various faiths and cultures within the NUS student community.

Executive Committee (ExCo) members include Hafizuddin Bin Aminuddin (President, 2025-2026), Muhammad Faiz Rosli (President, 2014-2015), Muhammad Haziq Bin Jani (President, 2012–2013), Zalman Putra Ahmad Ali (President), Danial Faizsal Anuar (President), Walid Jumblatt Abdullah (Vice President), Muhd Nurhakim (President, 2007), Hasanul Arifin (Vice President), Mohamed Nawab Mohamed Osman (President, 2001–2003), Syed Mohammed Ad'ha Aljunied (President, 1990-2000), Idris Rashid Khan Surattee (President, 1981) and Yaacob Ibrahim (Secretary, 1978)
