= Madrasah Irsyad Zuhri Al-Islamiah =

Madrasah in Singapore

- مدرسة إرشاد زهري الإسلامية

Location
- 277 Braddell Road; Singapore 579711; Singapore
- Coordinates: 1.342666°N 103.849825°E

Information
- Former name: Madrasah Al-Irsyad Al-Islamiah
- Type: Islamic, primary
- Motto: Strength and Honour
- Founded: 1947
- Session: Single session
- Principal: Warintek Ismail
- Area: Toa Payoh
- Colours: Teal, Light Yellow
- Website: irsyad.sg

Madrasah Irsyad Zuhri Al-Islamiah is a full-time co-educational madrasah offering primary education in Singapore. Madrasah is an Arabic word that means "school" However, in the Singaporean context, a madrasah means an Islamic religious school. "Irsyad" means rightly guided in Arabic.

Similar to the five other full-time madrasahs in Singapore (Aljunied Al-Islamiah, Alsagoff Al-Arabiah, Al-Arabiah Al-Islamiah, Al-Maarif Al-Islamiah and Madrasah Wak Tanjong Al-Islamiah), Irsyad is a private school which offers students an education comprising both ukhrawi (Islamic religious) subjects such as Arabic and Revelation studies, as well as duniawi (secular) subjects like English, Mathematics and Science. Irsyad's students take both secular and ukhrawi national exams. Many of its graduates move on to further their studies in Islamic Universities overseas and return to become asatizahs (religious teachers), while others attend the local polytechnics and universities. The school celebrated its 60th anniversary in 2007 and is operating at its permanent campus at the Singapore Islamic Hub.

== Leadership ==
Principal: Ustazah Warintek Ismail

Vice Principal (Academic): Mdm Faizah Abdul Rahman

Vice Principal (Administration): Mr. Zuremi Sukri

Manager (Operations): Ustaz Saddam Hussien Norazman

Coordinator (ICT): Mr. Rizal Jailani

== History ==
=== Mahadul Irsyad (1947–1990) ===
Madrasah Irsyad Zuhri Al-Islamiah was founded as Mahadul Irsyad at Hindhede Road (off Upper Bukit Timah Road) where the village called Kampong Quarry used to be. It was a small village school with an enrolment of about 50 students and was set up to provide basic Quran and Islamic knowledge to the villagers. Its education system was adopted from Johor, Malaysia, but starting from 1965, upon the suggestion of the then President of Singapore Mr Yusof Ishak, it was changed gradually to suit its needs. Unlike other madrasahs such as Aljunied and Alsagoff, Irsyad was not funded by wealthy Arabs and thus had to struggle to raise funds for the maintenance of the school ever since its founding. According to Ustaz Idris Bin Hj Ahmad, the Principal of Mahadul Irsyad in the 1950s and 1960s, teachers and villagers used to raise funds by selling paper flowers from door to door at Malay areas such as Geylang, Jalan Tempeh and Race Course.

=== Madrasah Al-Irsyad Al-Islamiah, Woodlands Road campus (1991–1996) ===
In 1991, many villages, including the village Irsyad was in, were affected by urban redevelopment projects. The madrasah was shifted to an old, unused government school at Woodlands Road and renamed Madrasah Al-Irsyad Al-Islamiah. It focussing on primary school education and increased its enrolment to around 400 students, though it remained a single-session school. By then, it had also come under the management of the Majlis Ugama Islam Singapura (MUIS), also known as Islamic Religious Council of Singapore. MUIS is a statutory board in charge of handling Muslim affairs.

It was at this campus that the madrasah accomplished some firsts. For instance, although 50% of the curriculum was still dedicated to religious subjects, the General Curriculum from the Ministry of Education (MOE) was adopted for the secular subjects such that the students could sit for the PSLE. Ustaz Ahmad Sonhadji Mohamad, the then Chairman of Irsyad, contributed significantly to the Muslim population in Singapore by introducing Iqra'. Iqra' is a methodology of learning to read the Quran rapidly.

=== Madrasah Al-Irsyad Al-Islamiah, Windstedt Road (1996–2008) ===
Main gate of Madrasah Al-Irsyad Al-Islamiah at Windstedt Road

In 1996, just when Irsyad was settling down in its Woodlands campus, the construction of the MRT system entailed the widening of Woodlands Road, and forced Irsyad to shift yet again. This time, it was relocated to one of the two old buildings at Windstedt road. Madrasah Aljunied Al-Islamiah was then occupying the other building. The change in location caused a switch to double-sessions due to space constraints and the introduction of a standardised school uniforms to differentiate between Irsyad and Aljunied students.

In 1998, Irsyad had its first batch of Secondary 1 students due to increased demand for madrasah education. This increased the enrolment to 900 students. Previously, most of Irsyad's graduates continued their secondary school education at Madrasah Aljunied Al-Islamiah. The curriculum for secondary school students was designed such that they would sit for the Secondary Four Certificate examination (more commonly known as Sijil Thanawi Empat (STE)) conducted by MUIS, and the General Certificate of Education 'O'Level (GCE 'O’Level) at the end of Secondary 5.

In 1999, further changes to the primary level curriculum were made with Islamic subjects at lower primary level being taught in Malay rather than Arabic.

In 2003, MOE implemented the Compulsory Education (CE) Act. Under this act, all children, regardless of those attending national schools or madrasahs, have to sit for the PSLE. To better prepare for that eventuality, Irsyad was the first madrasah to introduce a new integrated religious curriculum for the primary school. It was developed and produced by MUIS and uses English as the medium of instruction.

=== Madrasah Irsyad Zuhri Al-Islamiah, Singapore Islamic Hub (2009–present) ===
In 2009, Irsyad moved to the Singapore Islamic Hub along Braddell Road which also houses the MUIS headquarters and Muhajirin Mosque. Its facilities include science lab, state-of-the-art computer labs, a garden, a library, a canteen and expansive football fields.

== The Irsyad Identity ==
=== School motto ===
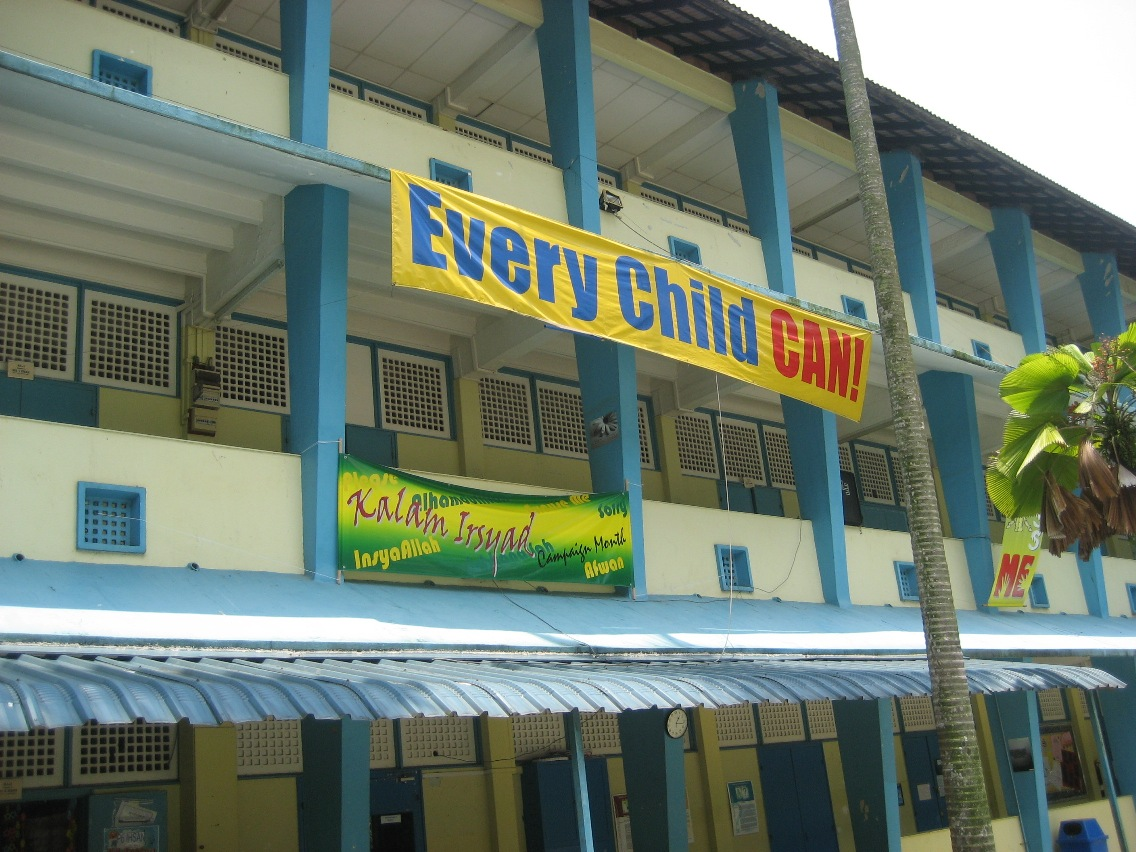
One of the school blocks. Big banners like these are hung around the school to create a vibrant environment.

The school motto is: Strength and Honour.

Irsyad school song is in Malay. It was composed while the school was at Hinhede Road by Cikgu A. Wahab Hamzah, Ms Faridah Ahmad and an ex-student Fazly A. Rahman. It describes the struggles that Irsyad has overcome, and the vision of the school.

=== School uniform ===
In Islam, the aurat has to be covered in the presence of non-mahram (strangers). For males, aurat is from the belly button to below the knees. For females, aurat is the whole body except the face and palms. Being an Islamic school, Irsyad's uniform conforms to the Muslim dress code and thus has a uniform that is quite different from the shorts and skirts of national schools in Singapore. Having a uniform that respects the aurat is one of the primary reasons why parents choose to send their children to madrasahs. This is especially so for girls.

The Irsyad school uniform for primary school boys consists of a short-sleeved cream coloured shirt which is worn tucked out, long turquoise pants with a simple black belt, a black songkok (traditional Malay headgear) and black canvas shoes. For secondary school boys, the sleeves are long and the shirt is worn tucked in with a black belt.

The school uniform for primary school girls consists of a loose long turquoise blouse that touches the calf, straight cut long pants, a long light-yellow cream tudung (headdress) that fully covers the chest, and black shoes and socks. For secondary school girls, the blouse and pants are replaced by a jubah (long loose dress).

== Academic structure and curriculum ==
=== Primary school ===
Like national schools, primary school education at Irsyad takes six years. However, due to the religious subjects that Irsyad students learn on top of mainstream secular subjects, a typical Irsyad primary school student's day ends at about 2 p.m daily; a few hours longer than their mainstream counterparts.

Irsyad students study secular subjects such as English, Maths, Science and Malay in about the same way as a student from a mainstream school does. They use the same textbooks, sit for the same PSLE, and use English as the language medium.

For religious subjects, the language medium is also English and the textbooks are written and produced by MUIS. The syllabus focuses on developing Islamic identity and character rather than being exam-centred. However, there is still emphasis on equipping the students with a strong Arabic language foundation.

Since 2008, it is important for Irsyad's Primary 6 cohort to do well in their Primary School Leaving Examination (PSLE) due to the introduction of the Compulsory Education Act in 2003. According to the Act, every child must be enrolled in a national school for primary school education. Since madrasahs are not considered to be national schools, primary school madrasah students are exceptions to the Act. To maintain its "designated institution" status, madrasahs have to meet a certain minimum PSLE benchmark. This benchmark is pegged at the average PSLE aggregate score (rounded up to the nearest whole number) of EM1 and EM2 Malay pupils in the six lowest-performing national schools, ranked based on the performance of their EM1 and EM2 Malay pupils in the PSLE of the same year. This translates to the Primary 6 pupils scoring around 175 points on average. Madrasahs were given six years to prepare their students to meet this benchmark. Thus 2008 is the first year that Irsyad students will be sitting for their PSLE with the heavy burden of ensuring that their primary school remains in existence.

Students in Madrasah Irsyad also actively participate in National-level competitions and have achieved various awards such as the Raffles Institution Primary Math World Contest (RIPMWC), Singapore Mathematical Olympiad for Primary Schools (SMOPS) by Hwa Chong Institution and the National Mathematical Olympiad of Singapore (NMOS) by the NUS High School of Math & Science. They also have done quite well in the area of robotics where the students have achieved awards in the Asia-Pacific Youth Robotics Competition and the National Robotics Competition by the Singapore Science Centre.

=== Secondary school ===
After sitting for the PSLE, Irsyad students used to be able continue their secondary school education at the same institution. Now they are either streamed to Madrasah Aljunied or Madrasah Al-Arabiah under the Joint Madrasah System (JMS) if they meet the minimum requirements or may transfer to any of madrasahs offering secondary education. Before 2015, if they choose to continue at Irsyad, they will study for another five years (four years for 2014 Secondary 1 Batch). At the end of the 4th year (3rd year for 2014 Secondary 1 Batch), they will receive a Secondary Four Certificate (STE) endorsed by MUIS for the religious subjects they studied, and at the end of the 5th year, they will sit for their GCE 'O’Level exams. Again, Arabic language is strongly emphasised with a 2-year Arabic Mastery programme being integrated into the curriculum. Now since Irsyad will no longer take secondary students, the Secondary 1 Batch of 2014 are the final students of Irsyad Secondary. This batch of students ended their secondary education at Secondary 4 with O levels. Some of the students opted to sit for the STE in the same year in 2017.

=== Post-Secondary School ===
After finishing their secondary school education, Irsyad students who choose the Islamic education path obtain pre-university education at other madrasahs that offer it, such as Madrasah Wak Tanjong, Madrasah Aljunied or Madrasah Al-Maarif, before proceeding to Islamic universities all over the world.

Increasingly, many Irsyad graduates are choosing the secular academic pathway. This means that with their GCE 'O'Levels, they enrol in either Institute of Technical Education (ITE), polytechnics, junior colleges or other institutes such as the Nanyang Academy of Fine Arts (NAFA). Many then graduate well enough from those institutes and move on to further their studies in local universities.

== Culture ==
=== Special Programmes ===
==== TIPS ====
TIPS is an acronym for the Tarbiyah Incentive Points System. In most national schools, a student's semestral grade for the category of conduct is determined in a subjective manner by the student's form teacher. At Irsyad, that grade is assessed based on Incentive and Penalty points awarded by all teachers concerned over a period of one year.

At the beginning of the year, each student is given 75 TIPS points (equivalent to a "Good" grade). When a student does meritorious acts and displays commendable behaviour, incentive points are awarded to his individual TIPS account, as well as to the class and house accounts respectively. Conversely, when a student misbehaves, penalty points are deducted from all three accounts. This system is effective in developing a student's sense of responsibility and in cultivating the idea that each of one's actions has consequences on others.

==== APEX Programme ====
Logo of APEX

APEX is an acronym for Ace PSLE Exams. In this programme, bright Muslim youths from tertiary institutes and beyond voluntarily serve as mentors (in the academic, emotional and spiritual sense) of Primary 6 Irsyad students in light of their upcoming PSLE exams. Mentoring sessions take up Saturday mornings and involves traditional small group tutoring (with a ratio of about two students to one mentor), educational games and casual interactions between the mentors and the students.

This is one programme that was initiated not by the Madrasah, but by a group of National University of Singapore (NUS) undergraduates under the umbrella of the NUS Muslim Society. The trigger for this initiation is the establishment of the Compulsory Education Act. As mentioned earlier, under this act, madrasahs have to meet a certain PSLE benchmark to obtain "designated school" status, which is needed to allow them to continue admitting students exempted from CE at national schools. Thus, Apex was set up to help madrasahs achieve that benchmark. As this is a new programme, only Irsyad has thus far benefitted from this programme. However, the Apex committee is in the process of expanding the programme to the other madrasahs that are also affected by the CE.

=== Personalities ===
Despite its village school roots, Irsyad has been successful in the Nasyid music industry. Nasyids are songs that have spiritual messages and conform to the Islamic guidelines for music. Irsyad has grown two successful all-boys nasyid groups: Nur Irsyad and Irsyadee.

==== Nur Irsyad (NI) ====
Nur Irsyad was formed in June 2000 to make a fundraising album for Irsyad's building fund project. It consisted of six teens then studying in Irsyad. Their album proved to be a hit, selling over 15 thousand units in Singapore and Malaysia alone. After completing their studies in Irsyad, the group became a commercial one, under the company NI Inspirations. A few of the members left the group to focus on their further studies and new ones from all over Malaysia joined, such that now only two of them are original members, which is Nor Muhammad Ali as a leader and Muhammad Izzaki Nasir, while another two new members, Nik Ahmad Afham bin Nik Abdullah from Kelantan and Mohd Rozaini Mohd Rahim from Pahang, Malaysia. They continue to be successful, having launched their third album in 2008 and latest album in 2009. Despite their commercial success, Nur Irsyad has yet to forget its roots as can be seen from the motivational, artistic and fundraising programmes they organise for students, madrasahs, mosques and other Muslim organisations in Singapore.

==== Irsyadee ====
Irsyadee is a now inactive Nasyid group formed in 2007 for the same reason as Nur Irsyad; to raise funds for the Madrasah. They launched their debut album last year during Irsyad's 60th anniversary carnival. It is made up of five Irsyad secondary school boys.

=== Singapore Islamic Hub ===
The permanent building at the Singapore Islamic Hub has been highly anticipated. The complex houses the Islamic Religious Council of Singapore (MUIS) headquarters, Madrasah Al-Irsyad Al-Islamiah and Muhajirin Mosque.

The building housing Irsyad has facilities like a school library, auditorium, science and computer laboratories and sports halls Foundation; Singapore Islamic Hub, all of which were either non-existent or inadequate at Irsyad's previous campus.

As of 2008, Irsyad was still $7 million short of its target of $16 million needed for the development of the new building. The Irsyad Fund Development Unit (FDU) was set up to raise funds for the new building as well as for the costs of running the school.

=== Joint Madrasah System ===
In 2007, it was announced that the Joint Madrasah Scheme will be introduced in 2009. Under this scheme, Madrasah Al-Irsyad will start specialising in only primary education while Aljunied and Al-Arabiah will focus on secondary education. The other three madrasahs not included in this scheme will continue to offer both levels of education. The aim of the scheme is to address the perennial problems of madrasah operators: limited funds and the need to improve standards for primary and secondary students. This is especially in light of the government requirement of madrasah students attaining at least a certain benchmark in the PSLE in order for the madrasahs to be able to continue offering primary school education.

== Co-Curricular Activities ==
The list of Co-Curricular Activities currently/previously available to students:

=== Clubs ===
1. Aikido Club
2. Art & Craft Club
3. InfoComm Club
4. Journalism Club
5. Khat Club (Islamic Calligraphy)
6. Math Scientist Club
7. Robotics Club (Beginner)
8. Robotics Club (Advance)
9. Speakers' Club
10. Young Chefs Club
11. Chess Club

=== Sports ===
1. Archery
2. ArcheryTAG
3. Badminton
4. Horse Riding
5. Netball
6. Soccer (Boys)
7. Swimming
8. Taekwondo
9. Outdoor activities

Note that currently, during the Covid-19 pandemic, all Co-Curricular Activities were temporarily discontinued.

== See also ==
- Islam in Singapore
