= Majlis Ugama Islam Singapura =

Organisation that oversees the religious aspects of Singaporean Muslims

Agency overview
- Formed: 1 July 1968; 58 years ago
- Jurisdiction: Singapore
- Headquarters: 273 Braddell Road, Singapore Islamic Hub, Singapore 579702
- Employees: 127 (2012)
- Annual budget: S$2.248 million (2012)
- Minister responsible: Zaqy Mohamad (acting), Minister in-charge of Muslim Affairs
- Agency executives: Mohamed Sa'at Abdul Rahman, President; Kadir Maideen, Chief Executive; Nazirudin Mohd Nasir, Mufti
- Parent agency: Ministry of Culture, Community and Youth
- Website: www.muis.gov.sg
- Agency ID: T08GB0028L

Majlis Ugama Islam Singapura

Chinese name
- Simplified Chinese: 新加坡回教宗教理事会
- Traditional Chinese: 新加坡回教宗教理事會
Transcriptions
Standard Mandarin
- Hanyu Pinyin: Xīnjiāpō Huíjiào Zōngjiào Lǐshìhuì

Malay name
- Malay: Majlis Ugama Islam Singapura

The Majlis Ugama Islam Singapura (MUIS), also known as the Islamic Religious Council of Singapore (IRCS), is a statutory board of the Ministry of Culture, Community and Youth of the Government of Singapore. As a majlis, its role is to look after the administration and interests of Singapore's Muslim community. The Majlis is headed by a Council, in which members are appointed by the President of Singapore. Since 2009, the council is headquartered in the Singapore Islamic Hub, along Braddell Road.

== History and role ==
MUIS was established in 1968 when the Administration of Muslim Law Act (AMLA) came into effect. Under AMLA, MUIS is to advise the President of Singapore on all matters relating to Islam in Singapore. The role of MUIS is to see that the many and varied interests of Singapore's Muslim community are looked after.

The principal functions of MUIS are:

- Administration of Zakat, Wakaf (endowment), pilgrimage affairs, and Halal certification and other activities related to the socio-religious life of Muslims in Singapore
- Construction, development, administration and management of mosques
- Development and administration of Islamic Education and Madrasah
- Issuance of religious guidance to the community

== The Council of MUIS ==
The Council of MUIS operates as the overall decision-making body and has responsibility for the formulation of policies and operational plans.

The Council comprises the President of MUIS, the Chief Executive, the Mufti of Singapore, as well as members recommended by the Minister-in-Charge of Muslim Affairs and other persons nominated by Muslim organisations. The President of Singapore appoints all members of the Council.

Members of the 19th MUIS Council will serve a three-year term effective 7 August 2022.

=== 19th MUIS Council ===
Name	Role
Mr Mohamed Sa'at Abdul Rahman	President
Mr Kadir Maideen	Chief Executive
Dr Nazirudin Mohd Nasir	Mufti
Ustaz Pasuni Maulan	Member
Mr Abu Bakar Mohd Nor	Member
Mdm Zuraidah Abdullah	Member
Mdm Nur Liyana Mohamed Sinwan	Member
Mr Azriman Mansor	Member
Mr Mohamed Ismail s/o Abdul Gafoor	Member
Ustaz Fathurrahman Hj M Dawoed	Member
Mr Sultan Mohamed Ghouse	Member
Ustaz Muhammad Ishlaahuddin Jumat	Member
Mr Wasim Abdul Majeed	Member
Mdm Zarina Begam Abdul Razak	Member
Mdm Rahayu Mohamad	Member
Ustaz Mohamad Hasbi Hassan	Member
Ustazah Kalthom Muhammad Isa	Member
Mr D'Cruz Firdaus Lionel Wilfred	Member
Dr Nurhidayati Mohamed Suphan	Member

== MUIS Management ==
=== MUIS Senior Management ===
Appointment	Name
Chief Executive	Mr Kadir Maideen
Deputy Chief Executive, Special Duites	Dr Albakri Ahmad
Deputy Chief Executive	Mr Khairul Anwar Mohamed Abdul Alim
Deputy Chief Executive	Mr Mohammad Azree Rahim
Mufti	Dr Nazirudin Mohd Nasir

=== Office of the Mufti ===
Appointment	Name
Mufti	Dr Nazirudin Mohd Nasir
Deputy Mufti	Dr Mohd Murat Md Aris
Deputy Mufti	Dr Izal Mustafa Kamar

== Singapore Fatwa Committee ==
Full Members

- Mufti Ustaz Dr. Nazirudin Mohd Nasir, Chairman
- Ustaz Dr. Izal Mustafa Kamar, Deputy Mufti
- Ustaz Dr. Firdaus Bin Yahya, Managing Director, Darul Huffaz
- Ustaz Irwan Hadi Bin Mohd Shuhaimy, Senior President of Syariah Court
- Ustaz Fathurrahman Bin Hj M Dawoed, Executive Director, Andalus
- Ustazah Dr. Rohana Binte Ithnin, Senior Council Member of Muis
- Ustazah Dr. Siti Nur 'Alaniah Binte Abdul Wahid, Founder & Director, Caliph Consultancy
- Ustazah Dr. Sakinah Binte Saptu, Freelance Asatizah

Senior Associate Members

- Ustaz Mohamad Hasbi Hassan, Chairman of Masyaikh Pergas
- Ustaz Dr. Mohd Murat Bin Md Aris, Deputy Mufti
- Ustaz Dr. Mohammad Hannan Bin Hassan, Former Deputy Mufti
- Ustaz Dr. Mohamed Bin Ali, Senior Fellow, S. Rajaratnam School of International Studies
- Ustaz Dr. Badrul Fata Bin Muhd Ridwan, Lecturer, Institut Pengajian Tinggi Al-Zuhri
- Ustaz Dr. Mohammad Rizhan Bin Leman, Lecturer, Institut Pengajian Tinggi Al-Zuhri
- Ustaz Dr. Mohammad Yusri Yubhi Bin Mohd Yusoff, Director, YusriYusoff Consulting
- Ustaz Mahmoud Mathlub Bin Sidek, Director, Religious Policy Development, Muis
- Ustaz Kamaruzaman Bin Afandi, Assistant Director, Public Education and Engagement, Muis
- Ustaz Mohd Kamal Bin Mokhtar, Shariah Committee Member of Maybank Islamic Berhad
- Ustaz Nor Razak Bin Bakar, Chairman of Asatizah Recognition Board
- Ustazah Nadia Hanim Binte Abdul Rahman, Member, Asatizah Youth Network, Muis
- Ustazah Raihanah Halid, Deputy Director, Religious Policy and Development, Muis

Associate Members

- Ustaz Dr. Afif Bin Pasuni, Principal Designate, Madrasah Aljunied Al-Islamiah
- Ustaz Mohamad Khidir Bin Abdul Rahman, Director, Education, Muis
- Ustaz Syakir Bin Pasuni, Registrar of the Registry of Muslim Marriages
- Ustaz Muhammad Ma'az Bin Sallim, Deputy Registrar of Registry of Muslim Marriages
- Ustaz Muhammad Azri Bin Azman, President of Muhammadiyyah Association
- Ustaz Ahmad Haris Bin Suhaimi, Freelance Asatizah
- Ustaz Muhammad Saiful Alam Shah Sudiman, Head, Religious Policy, Muis
- Ustazah Nur Khadijah Binte Ramli, Honorary Council Member of Pergas
- Ustazah Sri Nurayu Binti Mat Aris, Muis

== Committee of Future Asatizah ==
Chairman

- Mohamad Maliki Osman, Minister in Prime Minister's Office

Members

- Naziruddin Mohd Nasir, Mufti of Singapore
- Mohamad Hannan Hassan, Vice Dean of Muis Academy
- Seng Boon Kheng, Head of Master of Social Work Programme, SUSS
- Suzaina Kadir, Vice Dean (Academic Affairs), NUS
- Gog Soon Joo, Chief Futurist of SkillsFuture Singapore
- Mohamed Bin Ali, Co-Chairman of Religious Rehabilitation Group
- Ustaz Pasuni Maulan, Chairman of Asatizah Recognition Board
- Ustaz Abdul Mukhsien Shariff, Assistant Vice Principal of Madrasah Aljunied Al-Islamiah
- Ustaz Mohd Kamal Mokhtar, Member of Syariah Court's Appeal Board
- Nasser Ghani, Immediate Past President, Singapore Kadayanallur Muslim League
- Ustaz Tarmizi Abdul Wahid, President of PERGAS
- Ustazah Kalthom Mohd Isa, Vice-President of PERGAS

== Singapore Islamic Hub ==
The Singapore Islamic Hub is a religious campus that houses Masjid Muhajirin, Madrasah Irsyad Zuhri Al-Islamiah and the headquarters of Majlis Ugama Islam Singapura. These institutions combined (mosque, madrasa and majlis) create a cohesive and symbiotic whole, embodies the Islamic principles of Iman, Ilmu and Amal (Faith, Knowledge and Deeds) respectively.

== Halal certifications ==
The MUIS Halal services formally started in 1978. The increasing demand for Halal-certified products and eating establishments, as well as the need to regulate the Halal industry drove the move to set up its Halal Certification Strategic Unit.

In 2009, MUIS certified more than 2,600 premises.

== See also ==
- Islam in Singapore
- List of mosques in Singapore
- Majlis
