= Singapore College of Islamic Studies =

Islamic college in Singapore

- الكلية الإسلامية في سنغافورة (Arabic); Kolej Pengajian Islam Singapura (Malay) 新加坡回教学院 (Chinese) சிங்கப்பூர் முஸ்லீம் கல்லூரி (Tamil)
- Motto: Excellence in Faith and Knowledge
- Type: Religious
- Established: Expected 2028
- Religious affiliation: Islamic
- Chair: Abdullah Tarmugi
- Location: Singapore, Singapore
- Campus: Urban

Singapore College of Islamic Studies (SCIS) is an upcoming Islamic higher education institution in Singapore, owned and governed by the Islamic Religious Council of Singapore (MUIS), scheduled to commence operations in 2028.

SCIS is a religious educational institution established by MUIS.

== History ==
The establishment of the Singapore College of Islamic Studies was a strategic initiative by MUIS to enhance Islamic education in Singapore. Announced in August 2024, the college represents a significant milestone in the country's religious education landscape. Singapore's Mufti has described the institution as a crucial development, reflecting the nation's commitment to nurturing well-rounded religious leadership.

The announcement garnered significant attention from national leadership. Prime Minister Lawrence Wong highlighted the college's importance, emphasizing its potential to prepare students for leadership roles within religious and social sectors. To ensure comprehensive and global perspectives, the college will collaborate with several established international institutions. These partnerships include the Singapore University of Social Sciences, Egypt's Islamic advisory body Dar al-Ifta al-Misriyyah, the University of Jordan, and the Al-Qarawiyyin in Morocco. Leaders from these institutions and other universities, such as Al-Azhar in Egypt, will serve on the SCIS advisory panel, contributing their perspectives on contemporary issues impacting Muslim minorities.

== Academic programs ==
The college will offer a comprehensive undergraduate degree program designed to provide students with a holistic educational experience. The curriculum will integrate traditional Islamic studies with contemporary disciplines. Students will receive a balanced education that combines religious understanding with practical skills relevant to modern society.

== Campus and infrastructure ==
The college will be located at the Islamic Religious Council of Singapore's learning campus near Masjid Bencoolen. For its inaugural year in 2028, SCIS plans to admit an initial cohort of 60 students. This carefully planned approach allows for a focused and high-quality educational experience that can be gradually expanded in subsequent years.
