= Masjid Angullia =

Hanafi Sunni Mosque located in Little India, Singapore

Masjid Angullia مسجد اغكوليا
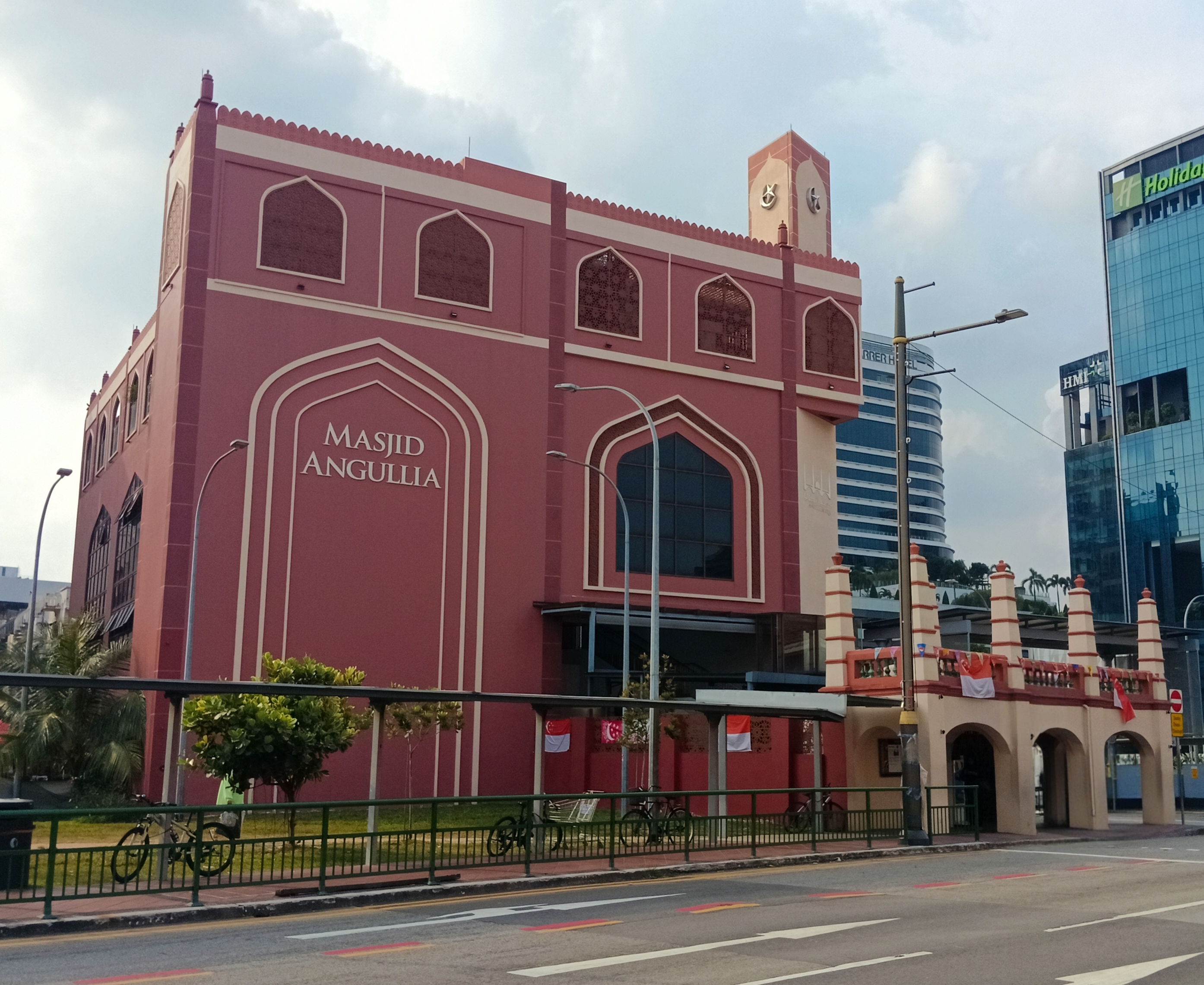
- Masjid Angullia as of 2026.

- Location in Singapore

Religion
- Affiliation: Sunni Islam

Location
- Location: 265 Serangoon Road, Singapore 218099
- Country: Singapore
- Coordinates: 1.3103923°N 103.8541061°E

Architecture
- Type: Mosque
- Style: Islamic architecture
- Founder: Ahmad Mohamed Salleh Angullia
- Established: 1819
- Completed: 1898 (Original); 1970 (First reconstruction); 2020 (Second reconstruction)

Specifications
- Capacity: 2,500
- Dome: 1

Masjid Angullia (Jawi: مسجد اڠݢوليا) is a historic mosque in Little India, Singapore. Built in the 1890s by a Gujarati merchant named Ahmad Mohamed Salleh Angullia, the mosque is a heritage site and landmark amongst Indian Muslims of Singapore. The mosque has also been rebuilt twice in 1970 and then 2020, with the original gatehouse of the mosque being listed for conservation in 2014.

== History ==
Mohamed Salleh Eusoof Angullia, an Indian Muslim businessman from the prestigious Angullia family of Gujarat, emigrated to colonial Singapore in 1870 along with his family to establish business in the country; eventually gaining prominence in the country as a leading figure in the Indian Muslim community with his real estate company, M.S.E Angullia & Co. In 1819, Angullia bought a plot of land along Serangoon Road and released it under a waqf for the construction of a mosque. It was a tradition for successful Indian Muslims in colonial Singapore to bequeath their assets towards waqf charitable endowments, which contributed significantly to the local Indian Muslim culture and heritage. The mosque, later named "Masjid Angullia" after him, was completed in stages between 1890 and 1900. After 1968, full management of the mosque was transferred from the Angullia family to the newly-formed Islamic council, the Majlis Ugama Islam Singapura (MUIS). Under the purview of the MUIS, the mosque was granted permission to be used as a place for the collection of the Zakat tax, as well as the registration for poor and needy Muslim families.

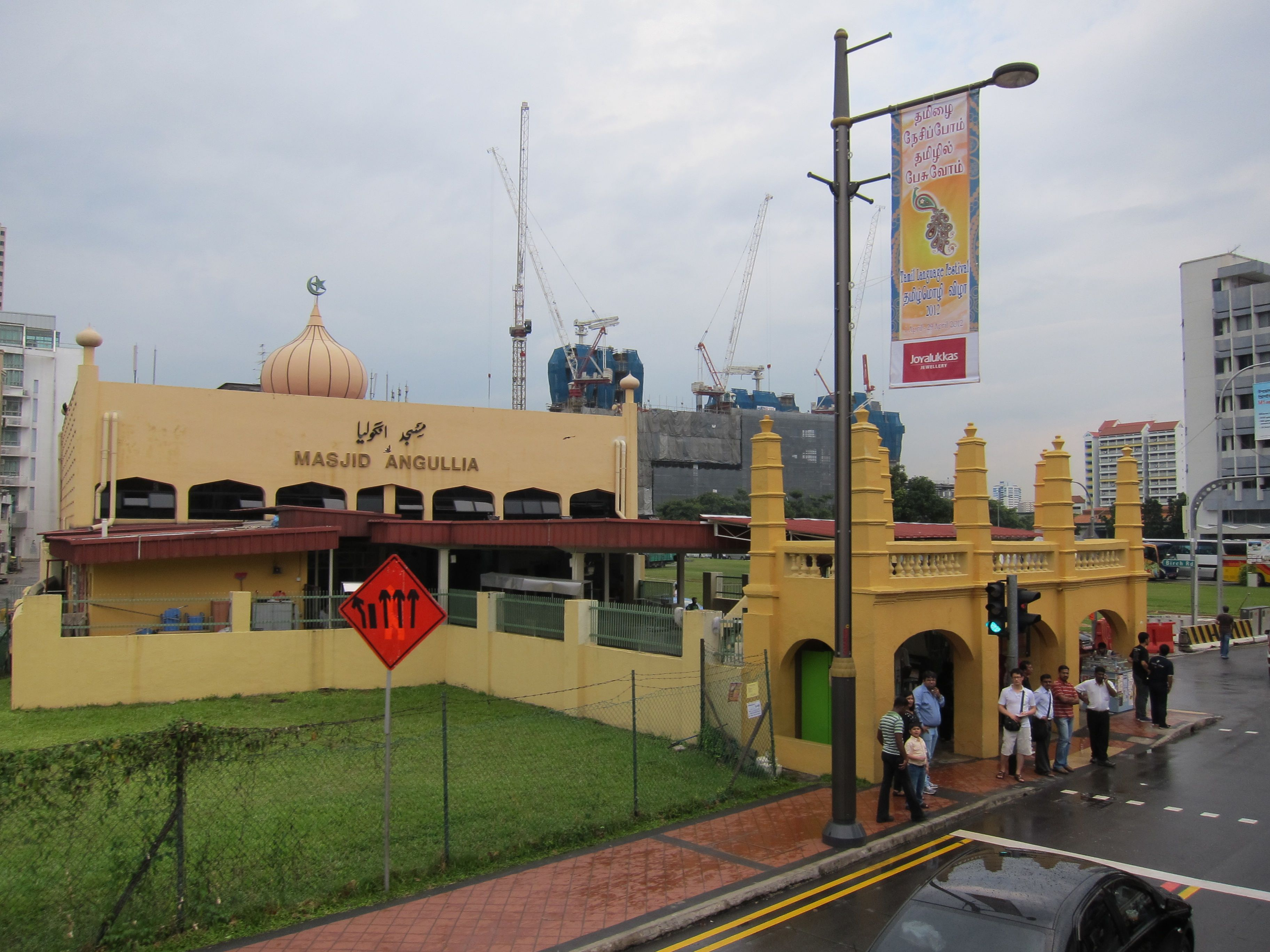
The 1970s structure before it was demolished in 2018.

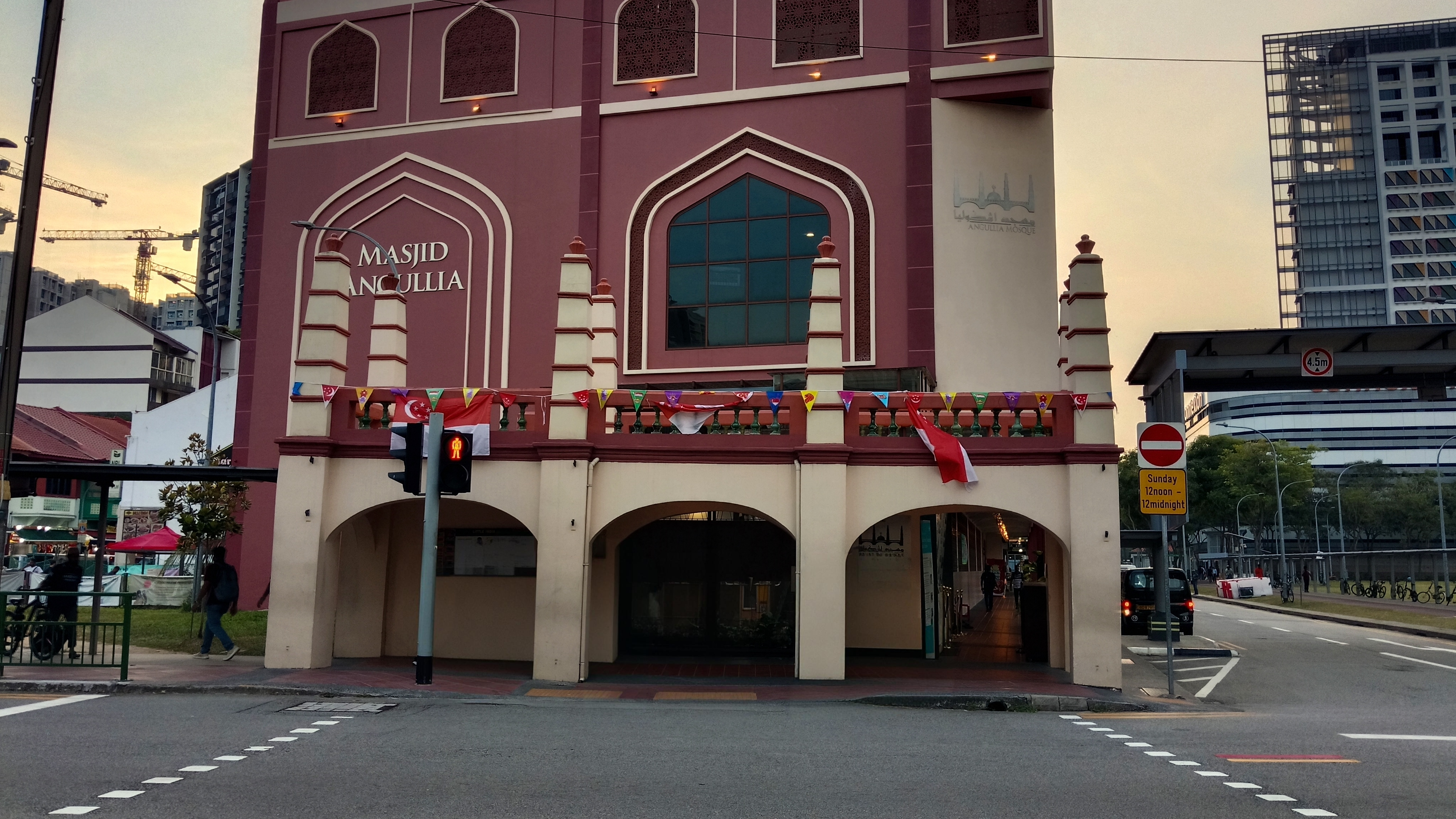
The gatehouse at the entrance of the mosque was listed for conservation by the URA.

In 1970, the mosque was rebuilt into a larger structure that had an increased capacity of 1,500 worshippers. The gatehouse of the mosque, the only part of the former mosque that had been retained, was marked as a Conserved Building by the Urban Redevelopment Authority (URA) in 2014. At the same time, plans to rebuild the rest of the mosque as a larger structure were confirmed after approval from the MUIS and the URA, with the guarantee that the gatehouse of the mosque would be incorporated into the newer structure. Then in 2018, the rest of the mosque was torn down to be rebuilt from the ground up. Nearby mosque, Masjid Abdul Gaffoor, served additional congregants from Little India as a temporary place for their Friday prayers until the completion of the new mosque. Additionally, the Tablighi Jama'at movement which had set up their headquarters in Masjid Angullia instead relocated to Masjid Bencoolen, another Indian Muslim mosque.

Masjid Angullia was completed by late 2019 and was officially reopened on 10 January 2020. The new mosque, which now had a capacity of 2,500 worshippers, featured an entirely new prayer hall, with a new basement that served as either a carpark or a place for dining and rest. The dome of the mosque was also replaced with a dome-shaped grille that served as a roof over a communal pavilion and garden. Relics from the old mosque, such as bricks, were also preserved and put on display at the entrance of the mosque.

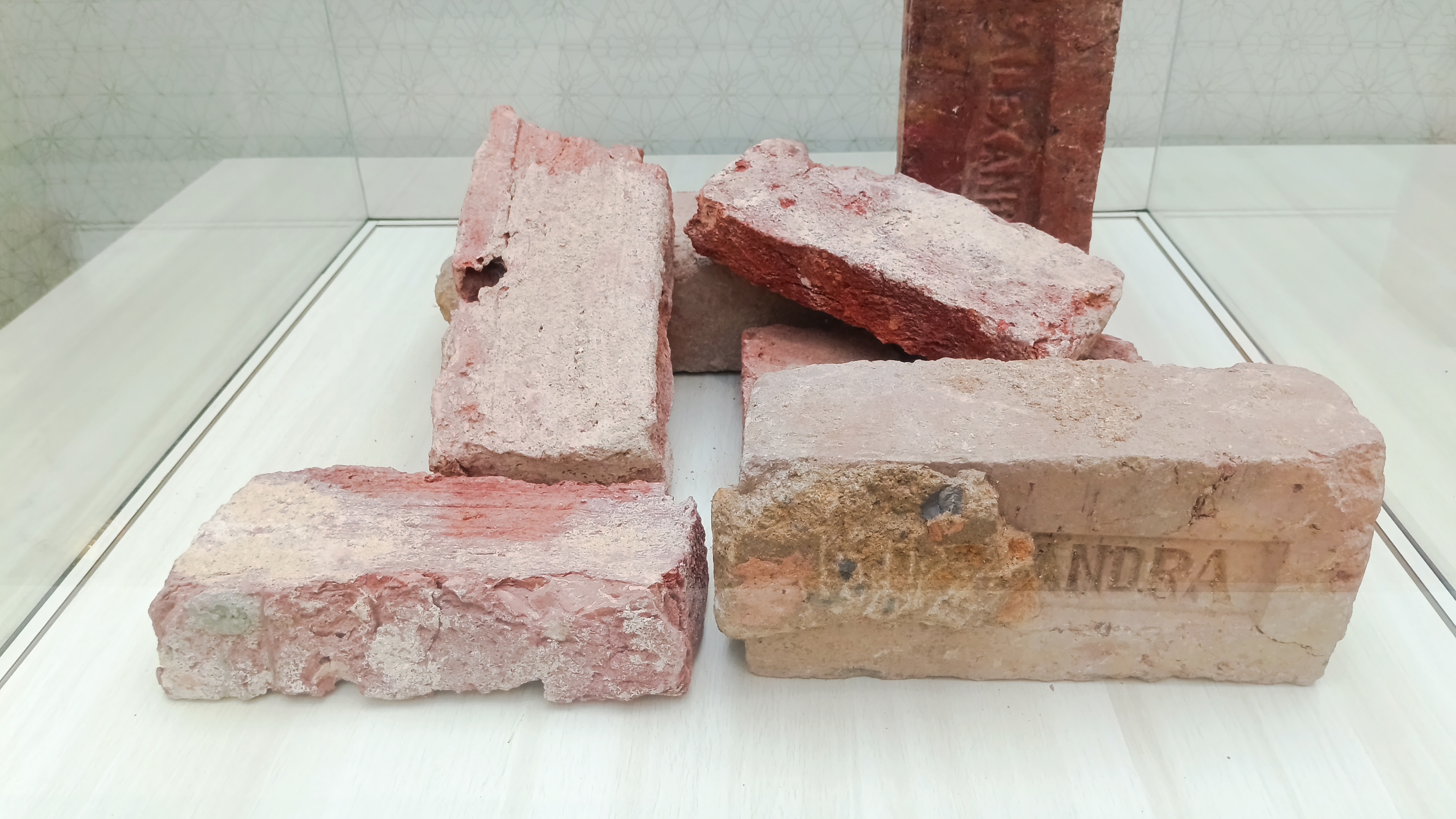
Old bricks from the original structure on display at the Angullia Heritage Gallery.

On 24 August 2024, the mosque committee launched the Angullia Heritage Gallery which occupied a part of the side facade of the mosque. This gallery showcased the history of the mosque and its founder, as well as the history of the Indian Muslim presence in Singapore.

== Cultural legacy ==
Masjid Angullia is a landmark of Little India as well as a heritage site of the local Indian Muslim community. It is also known for being the only surviving mosque of Gujarati origin in the country. In an effort to recognize the contributions of its founder, Mohamed Salleh Angullia, the present-day mosque is built in an architectural style which is predominately modern, but also combines modern styles with traditional Gujarati patterns and latticework. The mosque is also open to tourists and passersby in the Little India area.

== Transportation ==
Masjid Angullia is situated along Serangoon Road and is within walking distance from the Farrer Park MRT station on the North–East MRT line.

== See also ==
- Islam in Singapore
- List of mosques in Singapore
