= Islam in Singapore =

Singaporean Muslims

Total population
- 539,251 (2020 census); 15.6% of the resident (Note: In Singapore, the term "resident" refers to both citizens and permanent residents (PRs).) population

Religions
- Majority Sunni Islam with a small Shia minority

Related ethnic groups
- Malay Singaporeans, Tamils (minority), Pakistanis, Bugis, Javanese people, and others

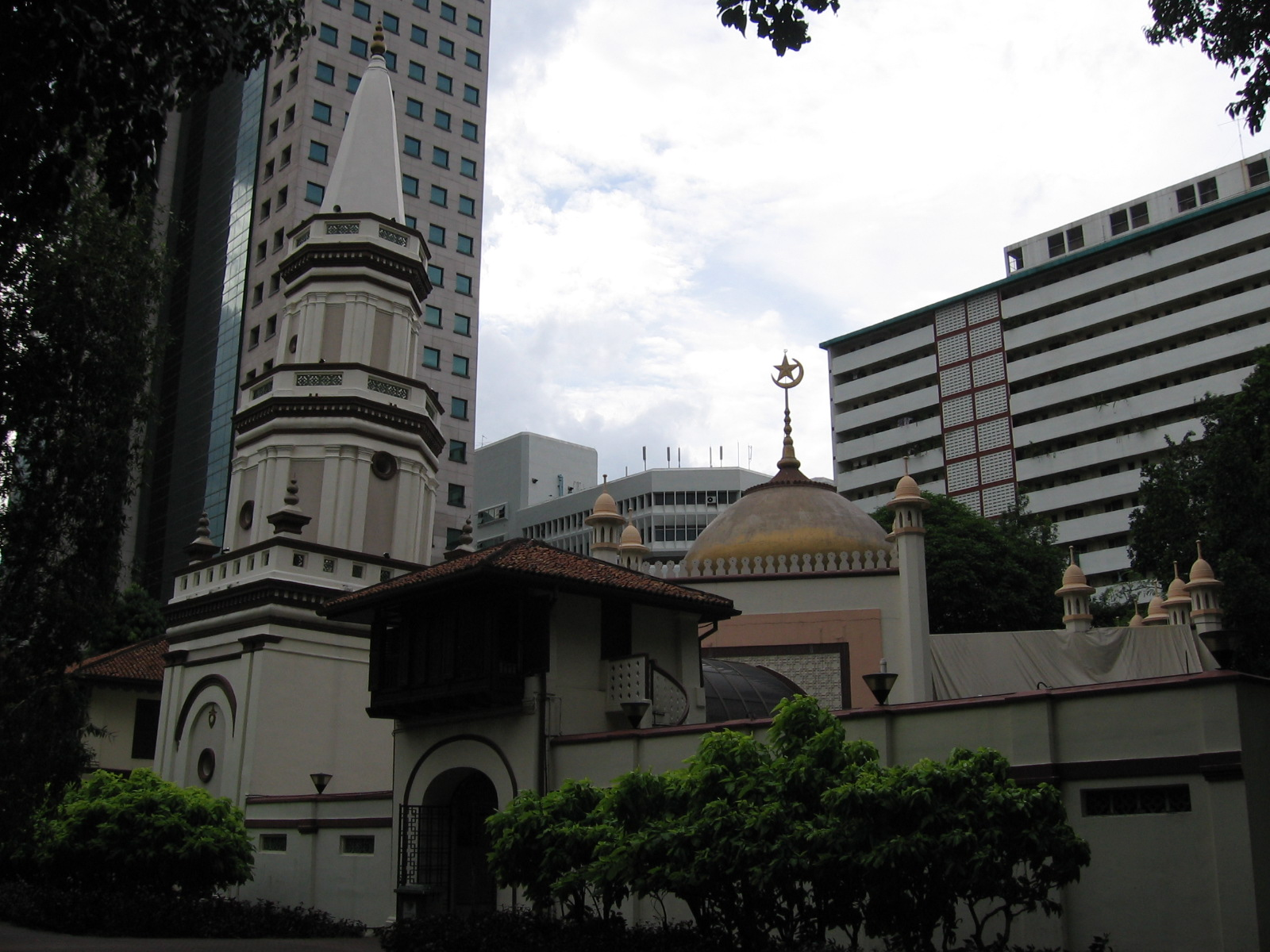
Masjid Hajjah Fatimah

Islam constitutes the third-largest religion in Singapore, after Buddhism and Christianity. Muslims account for approximately 15.6% of the population, as indicated by the 2020 census. Singaporean Muslims are predominantly Sunni adhering to either the Shafi‘i or Hanafi schools of thought. The majority of Muslims, about 80%, are ethnic Malays, while 13% are of Indian descent; the remaining fraction comprises local Chinese, Eurasian, and Arab communities, in addition to foreign migrants.

== Spread of Islam ==
Since the introduction of Islam in the region in the 14th century, Islamic bureaucracy formed an integral part of the administrative systems of the Malay Sultanates. In the 1500s, the Sultanate of Melaka was recorded to have applied Sharia law, a practice which was continued by the Johore Sultanate, of which Singapore was a part until 1824.

In 1915, the British colonial authorities established the Mohammedan Advisory Board. The Board was tasked with advising the colonial authorities on matters connected with the Islamic religion and custom.

Singapore became part of Malaysia in 1963 and was then expelled in 1965. The Constitution of Singapore included two provisions relating to the special position of the Malays and their religious rights, Article 152 and Article 153.

Article 152 states:

(1) It shall be the responsibility of the Government constantly to care for the interests of the racial and religious minorities in Singapore.

(2) The Government shall exercise its functions in such manner as to recognise the special position of the Malays, who are the indigenous people of Singapore, and accordingly it shall be the responsibility of the Government to protect, safeguard, support, foster and promote their political, educational, religious, economic, social and cultural interests and the Malay language.

Because of Article 152, Section 2, the Singapore government bans missionaries from proselytising the Malay population away from Islam towards other religions. This ban is meant to avoid engendering racial and religious tensions with the Muslim population. These tensions would arise because Malayness is closely and strongly identified with Islam.

Article 153 states:

The Legislature shall by law make provision for regulating Muslim religious affairs and for constituting a Council to advise the President in matters relating to the Muslim religion.

In 1966, the Singaporean Parliament passed the Administration of Muslim Law Act. Coming into effect in 1968, the Act defined the powers and jurisdiction of three key Muslim institutions:

1. the Islamic Religious Council of Singapore
2. the Sharia Court
3. the Registry of Muslim Marriages

These institutions are under the purview of the Ministry of Culture, Community and Youth (MCCY). The minister responsible for these institutions, however, is the Minister-in-charge of Muslim Affairs.

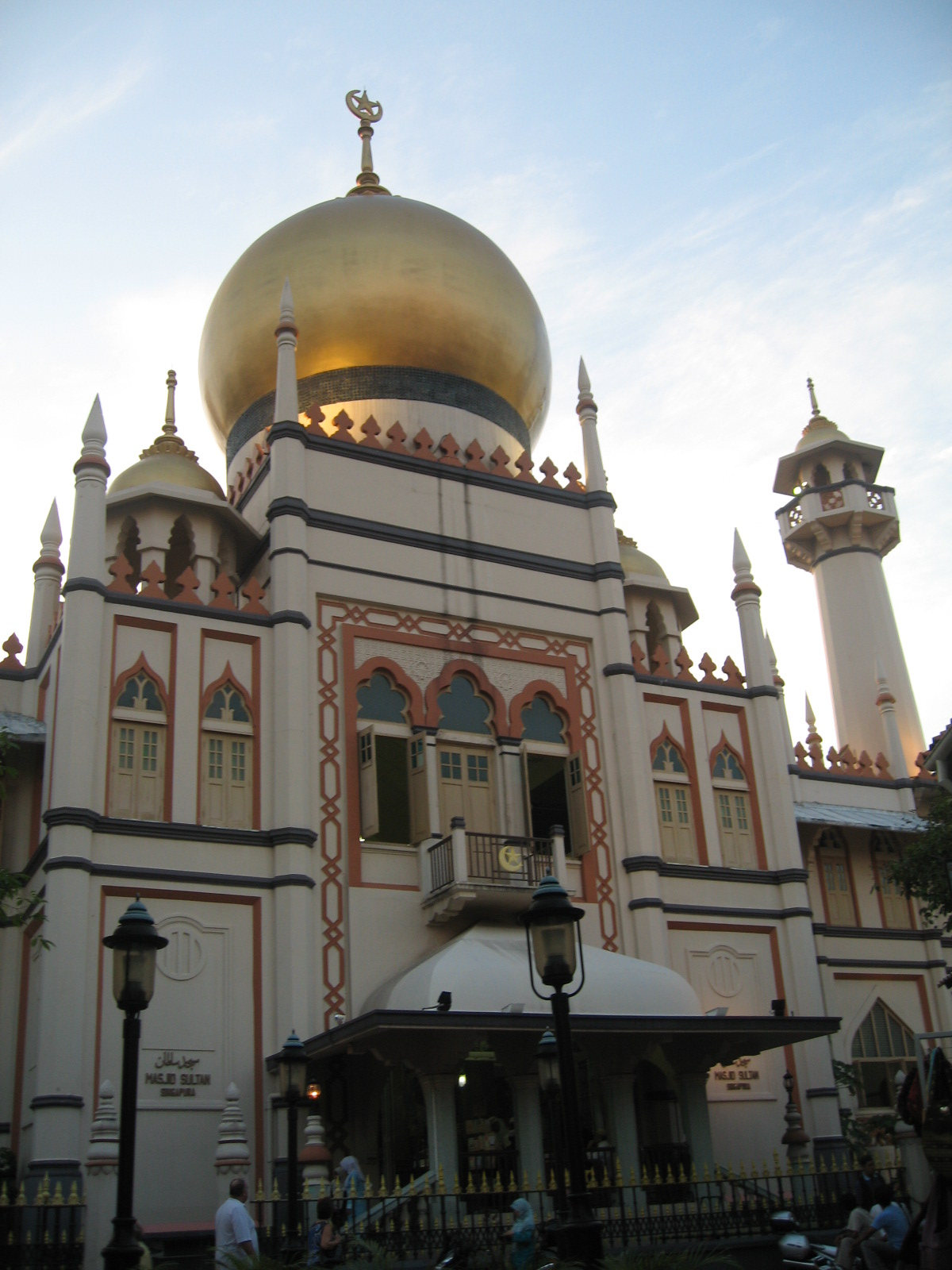
The Masjid Sultan (Sultan Mosque) in Singapore was built in 1824 and declared a national monument in 1973.

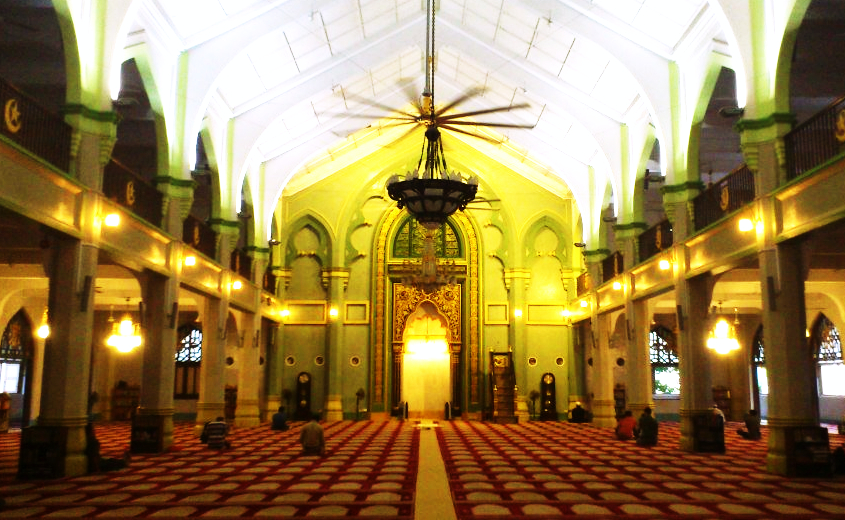
The main dewan solat (praying hall) of Masjid Sultan in Singapore

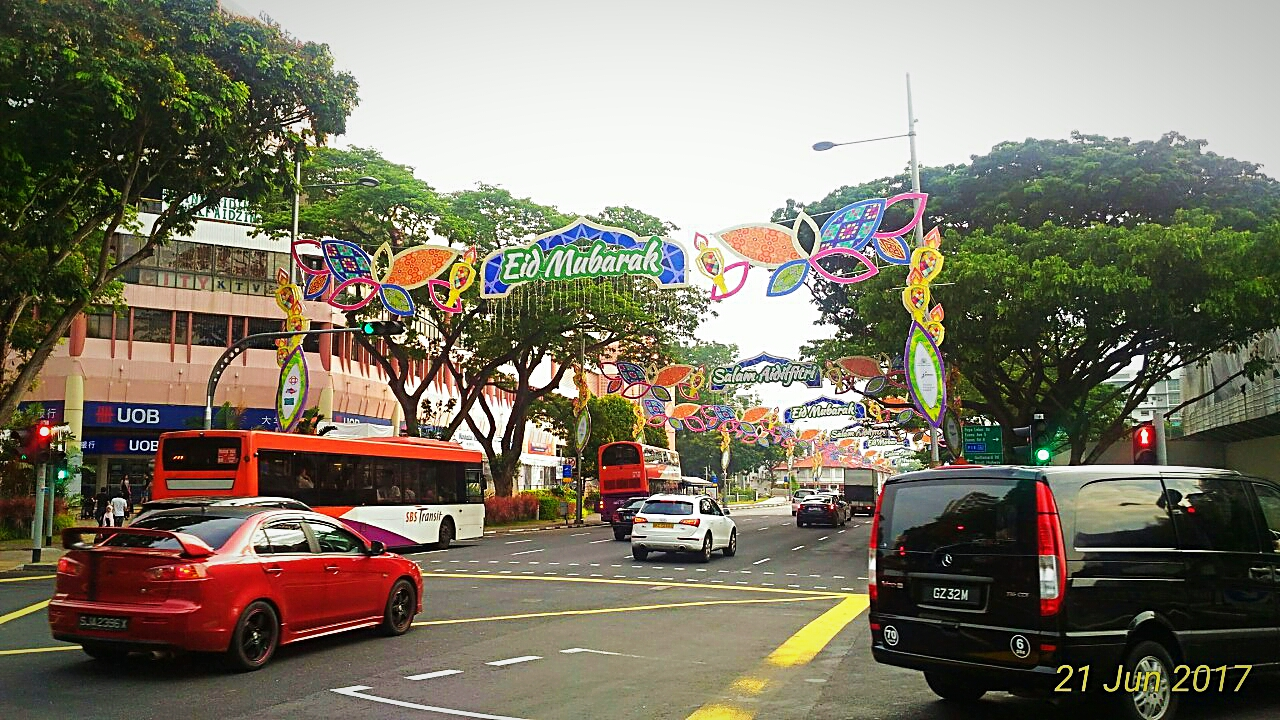
A street designed to Islam's Aidilfitri

== Demographics ==
According to the 2020 census, 15.6% of the resident population declared themselves Muslims. Most mosques in Singapore cater to Sunni Muslims due to the vast majority of Singaporean Muslims adhering to the Sunni Shafi'i or Hanafi school of thought, although there are mosques that cater to the needs of the Shia community as well. Singapore also contains the oldest Muslim women's organisation in the world: Young Women Muslim Association of Singapore.

Whilst a majority of Muslims in Singapore are traditionally ethnic Malays, there is also a significantly growing number of Muslims from other ethnic groups. There is a sizeable number of Muslims amongst ethnic Indians that include Tamil Muslims and ethnic Pakistanis in Singapore as well. For this reason, a number of mosques (mostly Tamil-speaking) specifically cater to the needs of the Indian Muslim community. Additionally, under the direction of the Islamic Religious Council of Singapore (MUIS), English is increasingly being used as the language of administration, religious instruction and sermons for Friday prayers in mosques across Singapore to cater to Muslims who may not necessarily be Malay-speaking.

Below is the ethnic breakdown of Muslims according to the 2020 Singapore Census of Population as follows:

Ethnic Group	Total Resident Population of Ethnic Group	Population of Resident Ethnic Group registered as Muslims	Percentage of Resident Ethnic Group registered as Muslims	Percentage of Muslim Residents by Ethnic Group
Chinese	2,606,881	11,953	0.46%	2.22%
Malays	447,747	442,368	98.80%	82.03%
Indians	299,056	69,964	23.39%	12.97%
Others	105,410	14,966	14.20%	2.78%
Overall	3,459,093	539,251	15.59%	100%

== Key Muslim institutions ==
=== Majlis Ugama Islam Singapura ===
The Majlis Ugama Islam Singapura (MUIS), also known as the Islamic Religious Council of Singapore, looks after and takes care of the administration and interests of Singapore's Muslim community.

The Majlis is headed by a Council, which comprises the President of MUIS, the Mufti of Singapore and other persons recommended by the Minister-in-Charge of Muslim Affairs. The council is appointed by the President of Singapore.

Since 2009, the council has been headquartered in the Singapore Islamic Hub, located along Braddell Road.

=== Shariah Court ===
In 1880, the British colonial authorities introduced the Mahomedan Marriage Ordinance which officially recognised the status of Muslim personal law in Singapore.

In 1958, pursuant to the 1957 Muslim Ordinance, a Syariah Court with jurisdiction to hear and determine disputes pertaining to Muslim marriages and divorce cases was established.

The Court replaced a set of government-licensed but otherwise unsupervised Kadi (Muslim judges) who had previously decided on questions of divorce and inheritance, following either the traditions of particular ethnic groups or their own interpretations of Muslim law.

Today, the Syariah Court continues to exist as a court of competent jurisdiction with power and jurisdiction to hear and determine disputes defined by AMLA.

=== Registry of Muslim Marriages (ROMM) ===
The Registry of Muslim Marriages is a government agency that registers marriages between couples that consist of two Muslims. Mixed-religion marriages are registered at the Registry of Marriages.

Previously, the registration of Muslim marriages as well as divorces were conducted under one unit, which is the Syariah Court.

It was first located in a bungalow at Fort Canning and later moved to Canning Rise in 1983.

Appeals on decisions of the Syariah Court and the ROMM are heard and determined by the Appeal Board.

Unlike MUIS, the Syariah Court and ROMM are not statutory boards but constitute a part of the Ministry of Social and Family Development).

== Muslim organisations ==
=== Ahmadiyya ===
The Ahmadiyya community was established during the era of the Second Caliphate, shortly before the Second World War. Ghulam Ahsan Ayyaz was the first missionary to the country, who under the directive of the caliph arrived in 1935, in a period when the territory was part of the Straits Settlements. In the 1970s, the community had roughly 200 followers.

=== Association of Muslim Professionals ===
The Association of Muslim Professionals is a community self-help group established on 10 October 1991, to improve the socio-economic performance of Singapore's Malay-Muslim community.

=== Malay-Muslim organisations ===
Apart from these key Muslim institutions, there are also community self-help groups, voluntary welfare organisations and civic groups like the Young Women Muslim Association of Singapore (YWMA), Association of Muslim Professionals, Yayasan Mendaki, Muslim Missionary Society (Jamiyah), PERDAUS, Singapore Islamic Scholars and Islamic Teachers Association (PERGAS), Muhammadiyah and Islamic Theological Association of Singapore (Pertapis).

=== Indian-Muslim organisations ===
There are also many Indian-Muslim organisations in Singapore e.g. Federation of Indian Muslims, Singapore Kadayanallur Muslim League, Koothanallur Association, Singapore Tenkasi Muslim Welfare Society, Thiruvithancode Muslim Union, and United Indian Muslim Association.

=== Religio-cultural groups ===
There are various religio-cultural groups in Singapore, such as Al Usrah Al Dandaraweyah, which is organized in the structure of a family, fostering close relationships among its members. Other notable groups include the Tariqah group at-Tariqah al-Ahmadiah al-Idrisiah ar-Rasyidiah and Naqshbandi Haqqani Singapore, both of which contribute to the spiritual growth and religious education of their members.

One of the earliest established religio-cultural groups, encompassing different Sufi orders like Qadriah, Chistia, Naqshabandiyah, Sanusiyyah, and Suharwadiyah, is now known as Khanqah Khairiyyah. Founded in 1971, the group has maintained its presence at the same location on Siglap Road in Singapore ever since.

Revamp.SG is a youth focused space that builds upon the tradition of different Sufi orders but particularly the Ba'Alawi from Yemen. The centre provides a safe and supportive environment for Muslims of all backgrounds to join and enjoy.

=== Shia organisations ===
The Shia community consists of Twelver Shi'ites, Ismailis and Dawoodi Bohras.

In Singapore, the history of the Twelver Shi'ites began with the immigration of the Khoja community from India. A member of Khoja community spearheaded the founding of the Jaafari Muslim Association.

In the 1980s, Malay members of the Muslim Youth Assembly (Himpunan Belia Islam) became part of the Shi'a community in Singapore. Subsequently, a center called Hussainiyah Azzahra was established to cater to their religious needs and activities. This development further diversified the religious landscape of Singaporean Muslims.

Both the Jaafari Muslim Association and the Muslim Youth Assembly cater to the Twelver Shi'ites.

The Dawoodi Bohras, a subsect of Shia Islam, are led by their spiritual leader, the Da'ie Almutlaq, who represents the twenty-first imam, Mohammed Burhanuddin. In Singapore, the Dawoodi Bohra community is served by the Anjuman-E-Burhani. Bohra traders began settling in Singapore in the 1820s. The Burhani Mosque, established in 1829, serves as the mosque for the Bohra community in Singapore.

The Ismailis are followers of Aga Khan. The Aga Khan has decided to establish an Ismaili Centre and regional representative office of the Aga Khan Development Network in Singapore.

== Hanafi Muslims ==
A significant number of Muslims in Singapore adhere to the Hanafi school of thought, mainly those who are Indian, Pakistani, Bangladeshi or Burmese. They usually intermix with the Shafi'i-majority Muslims. However, there are Indian-funded mosques which serve Hanafis, for example Masjid Abdul Gafoor, Masjid Bencoolen, Masjid Moulana Mohamed Ali and Masjid Anguilla. Masjid Malabar, despite being an Indian-funded mosque, does not cater to Hanafis as the Malabar Muslims generally adhere to the Shafi'i school of thought.

== Da'wah organisations ==
In Singapore, the Islamic Da'wah (invitation/conversion) movement has a significant influence. Numerous local and international organizations, such as Hikmah Times, contribute to this impact.

The Muslim Converts' Association of Singapore, also known as Darul Arqam, offers support and resources for individuals who have converted to Islam.

== Mosques ==
There are 72 mosques in Singapore. With the exception of Masjid Temenggong Daeng Ibrahim (which is administered by the State of Johor), all the mosques in Singapore are administered by MUIS. Twenty-three mosques were built using the Masjid Building and Mendaki Fund (MBMF). Masjid Al-Mawaddah, the twenty-third MBMF mosque, was officially opened in May 2009. The speakers for broadcasting the Islamic call to prayer was turned inwards to broadcast towards the interior of the mosques as part of a noise abatement campaign in 1974.

== Madrasahs ==
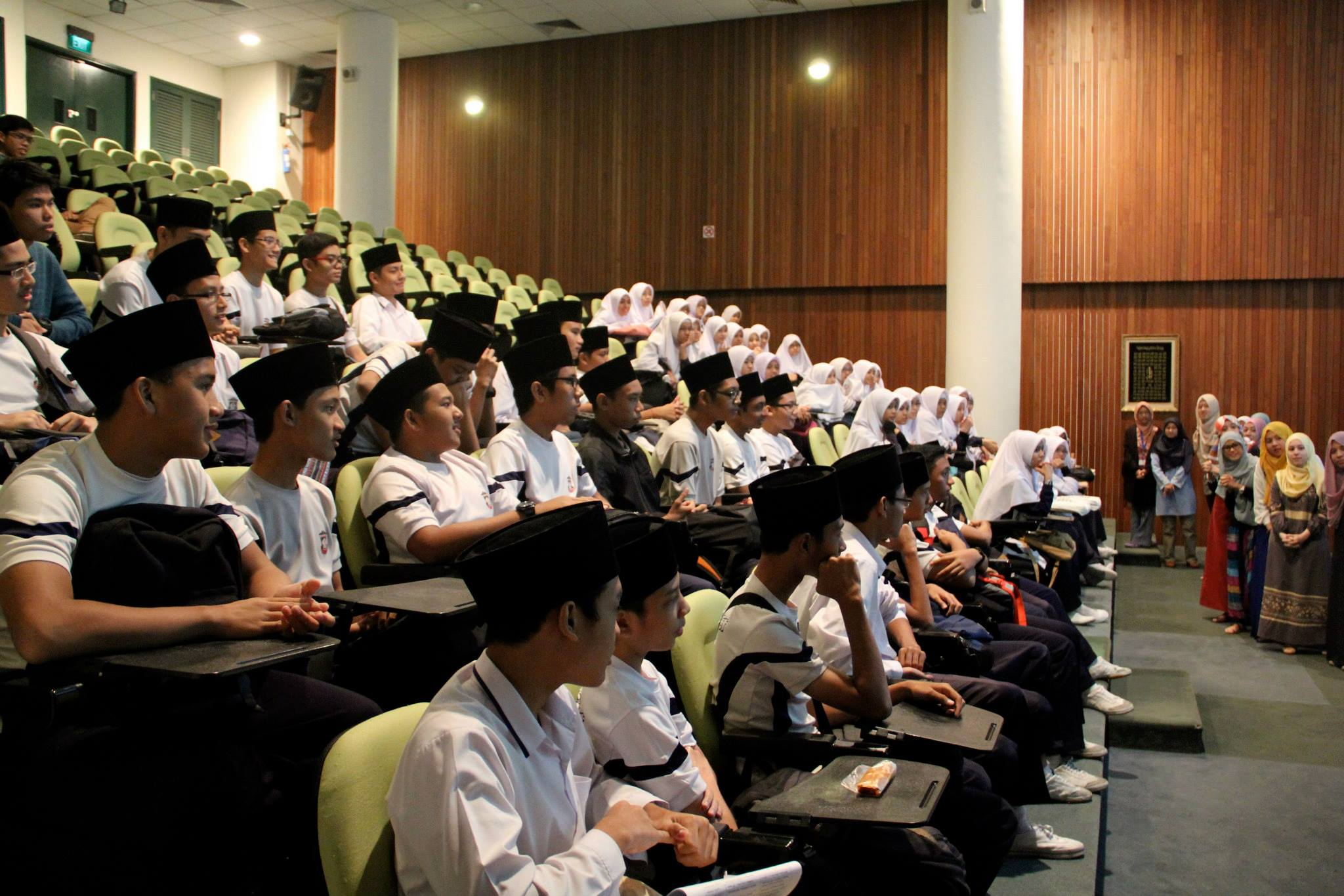
Students of Madrasah Aljunied Al-Islamiah in Singapore

In Singapore, madrasahs are private schools which are overseen by MUIS. There are six full-time madrasahs in Singapore, catering to students from Primary 1 to Secondary 4 (and junior college equivalent, or "Pre-U", at several schools). Four Madrasahs are coeducational and two are for girls. Students take a range of Islamic Studies subjects in addition to mainstream MOE curriculum subjects and sit for the PSLE and GCE 'O' Levels like their peers.

In 2009, MUIS introduced the "Joint Madrasah System" (JMS), a joint collaboration of Madrasah Al-Irsyad Al-Islamiah primary school and secondary schools Madrasah Aljunied Al-Islamiah (offering the ukhrawi, or religious stream) and Madrasah Al-Arabiah Al-Islamiah (offering the academic stream). The JMS aims to introduce the International Baccalaureate (IB) programme into the Madrasah Aljunied Al-Islamiah by 2019.

Students attending a madrasah are required to wear the traditional Malay attire, including the songkok for boys and tudung for girls, in contrast to mainstream government schools which ban religious headgear as Singapore is officially a secular state. For students who wish to attend a mainstream school, they may opt to take classes on weekends at the madrasah instead of enrolling full-time.

== See also ==
- Religion in Singapore
