= Masjid Abdul Gaffoor =

Historic mosque in Little India, Singapore

Abdul Gaffoor Mosque மஸ்ஜித் அப்துல் கஃபூர் مسجد عبد الغفور
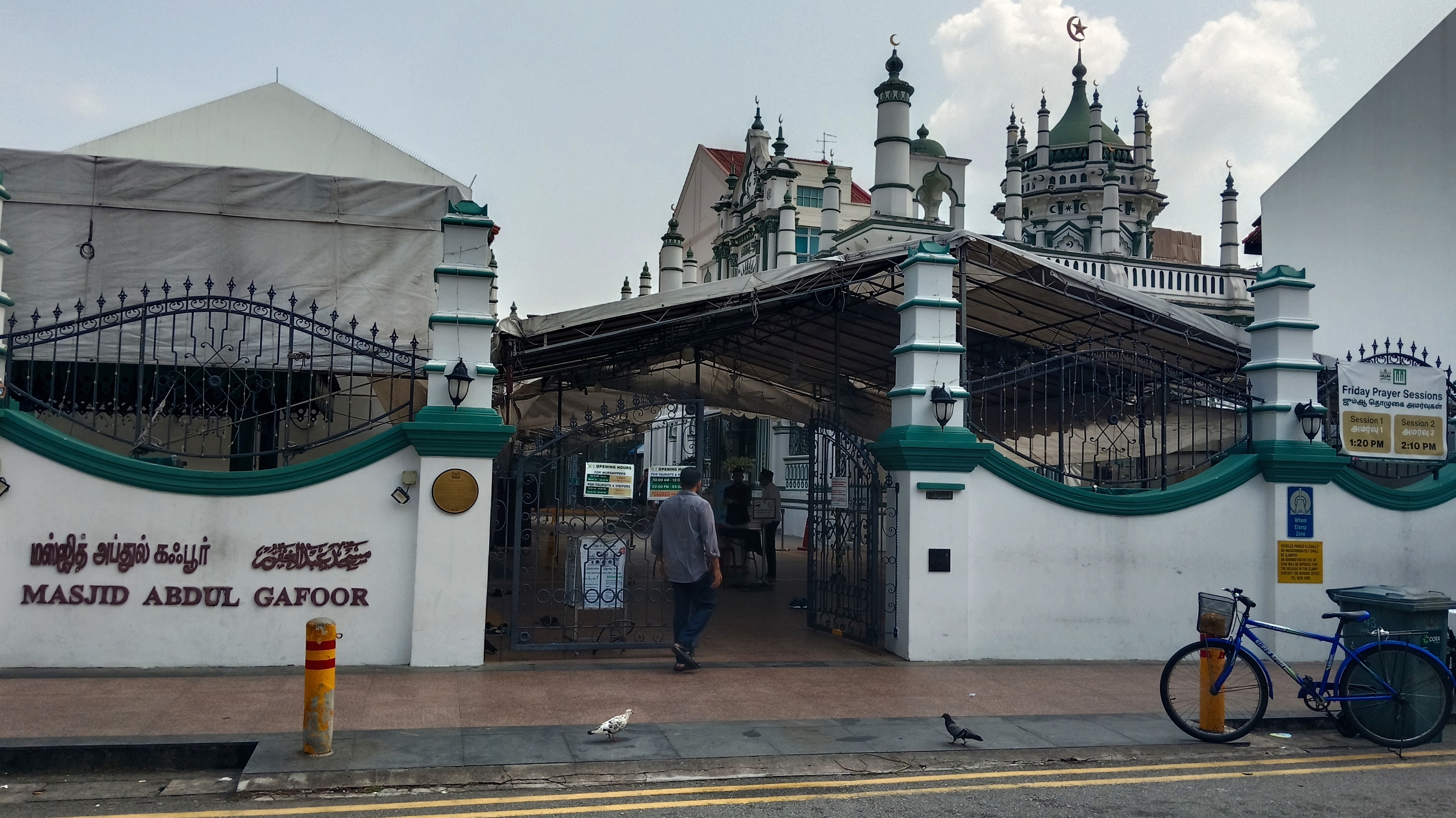

- Location in Singapore

Religion
- Affiliation: Sunni Islam

Location
- Location: 41 Dunlop Street, Singapore 209369
- Country: Singapore
- Coordinates: 1.304253°N 103.853743°E

Architecture
- Type: Mosque
- Style: Indo-Saracenic architecture
- Founder: Shaik Abdul Gaffoor
- Established: 1881
- Completed: 1910 (Reconstructed 2003)
- Dome: 1
- Designated as NHL

National monument of Singapore
- Designated: 5 July 1979; 47 years ago
- Reference no.: 18

The Abdul Gaffoor Mosque (Tamil: மஸ்ஜித் அப்துல் கஃபூர், Jawi: مسجد عبد الغفور, Malay: Masjid Abdul Gaffoor), sometimes known as Masjid Abdul Gafoor, is a historic congregational mosque located in Little India, Singapore. Formerly known as the Dunlop Street Mosque, it was built in 1910 by Shaik Abdul Gaffoor on the site of a smaller wooden mosque which stood in the area. Gazetted as a national monument in 1979, the mosque is a landmark of the Rochor planning area along with Masjid Angullia.

== History ==
The original structure at the site was a small mosque known as Al-Abrar Mosque (not to be confused with the mosque of the same name at Telok Ayer), which served the Muslim residents of areas within Kampong Kapor and Race Course Road; which were composed of Indian Muslim coolies and traders, as well as Baweanese horse trainers. This small mosque was built in the 1800s as a simple wooden structure containing a prayer hall, akin to a traditional surau. Shaik Abdul Gaffoor, a clerk at a local law firm, was appointed as a trustee of the Al-Abrar Mosque and later given permission to construct a larger mosque building in the compound of the Al-Abrar Mosque which was later named after him. He was also allowed to purchase several shophouses surrounding the mosque compound and use them as a source of finance for the mosque. Shaik Abdul Gaffoor later re-established an awqaf endowment for the mosque under his name in 1907. With the endowment, the mosque was rebuilt in 1910 as the Dunlop Street Mosque, although it would later be renamed as the Abdul Gaffoor Mosque by governmental authories.

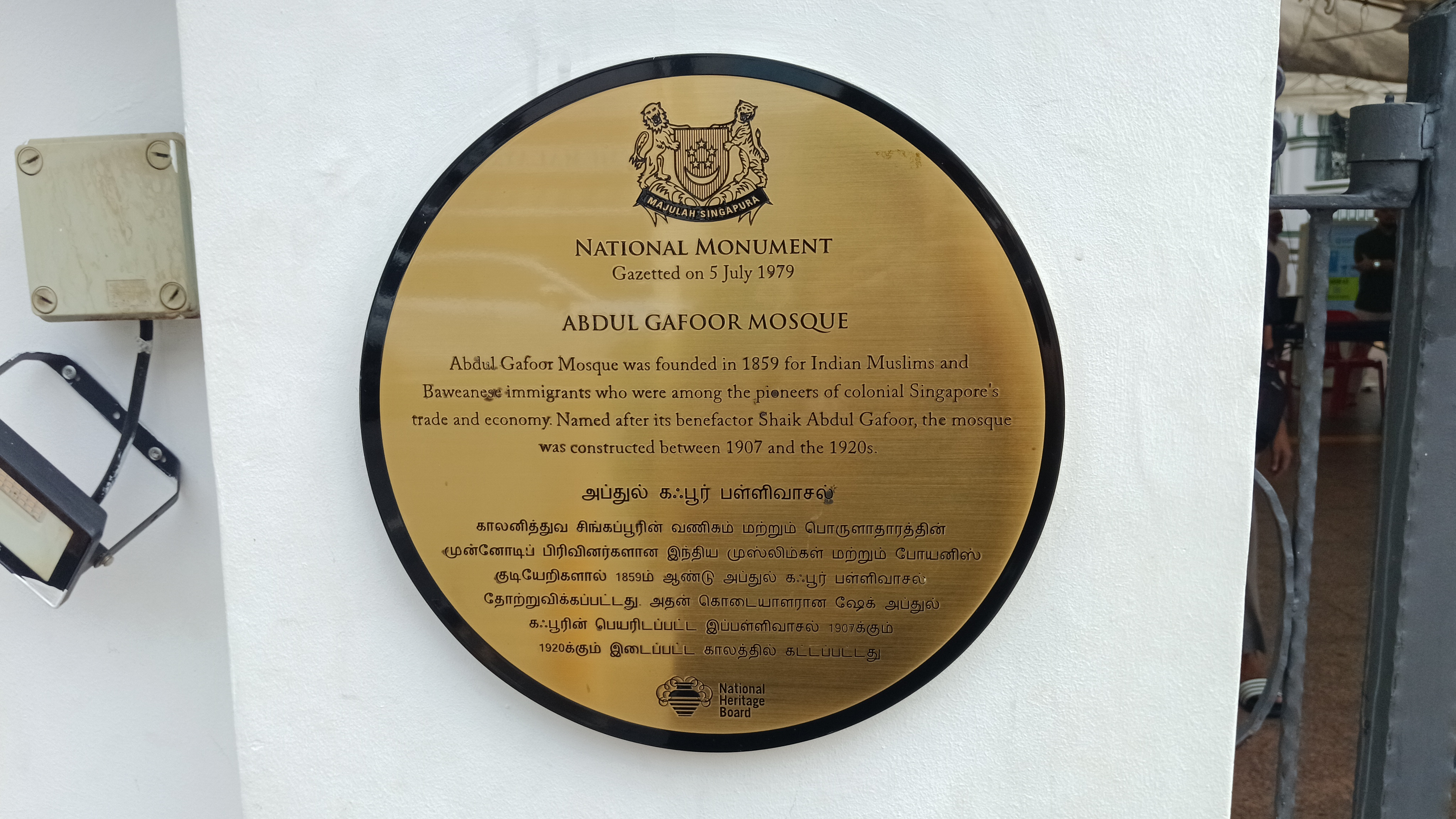
A plaque that commemorates the inauguration of the mosque as a national monument of the country.

After the formation of the Majlis Ugama Islam Singapura (MUIS) in 1968, management of the mosque was handed over to the MUIS by the surviving trustees of the Abdul Gaffoor Endowment. Later on 5 July 1979, the mosque was designated as a national monument of Singapore by the National Heritage Board. By the late 1980s, the mosque fell into a state of disrepair, prompting a $2.5 million restoration work that resulted in a major facelift for the mosque as well as the discovery of a hidden basement underneath the prayer hall. A further reconstruction was started in 2000, which took three years, with the mosque officially reopening on 16 May 2003. Then in October of the same year, the mosque received the Architectural Heritage Award from the Urban Redevelopment Authority in recognition for the reconstruction process involving the mixing of classical architectural styles with modernist architecture.

Renovation works to increase structural stability, ventilation and comfort in the mosque commenced on 20 February 2020. Various parts of the mosque were re-tiled, new carpets were installed, while the basement was reshelled and the mosque received a new coat of paint. By 2021, the mosque had been reopened to the public.

== Architecture ==
The overall style of the Abdul Gaffoor Mosque is eclectic, blending elements from Indo-Saracenic, Roman and Mughal architecture. The exterior of the mosque is primarily white in colour with green highlights and detailing. Modern architectural elements such as the windows, doors and administration offices are also present in the structure. The dome of the mosque is situated in the centre on the roof of the main prayer hall, composed of a cupola stacked on top of three hexagonal bases. Atop the main entrance to the mosque is a large sundial with the names of the twenty-five Islamic prophets inscribed on it.

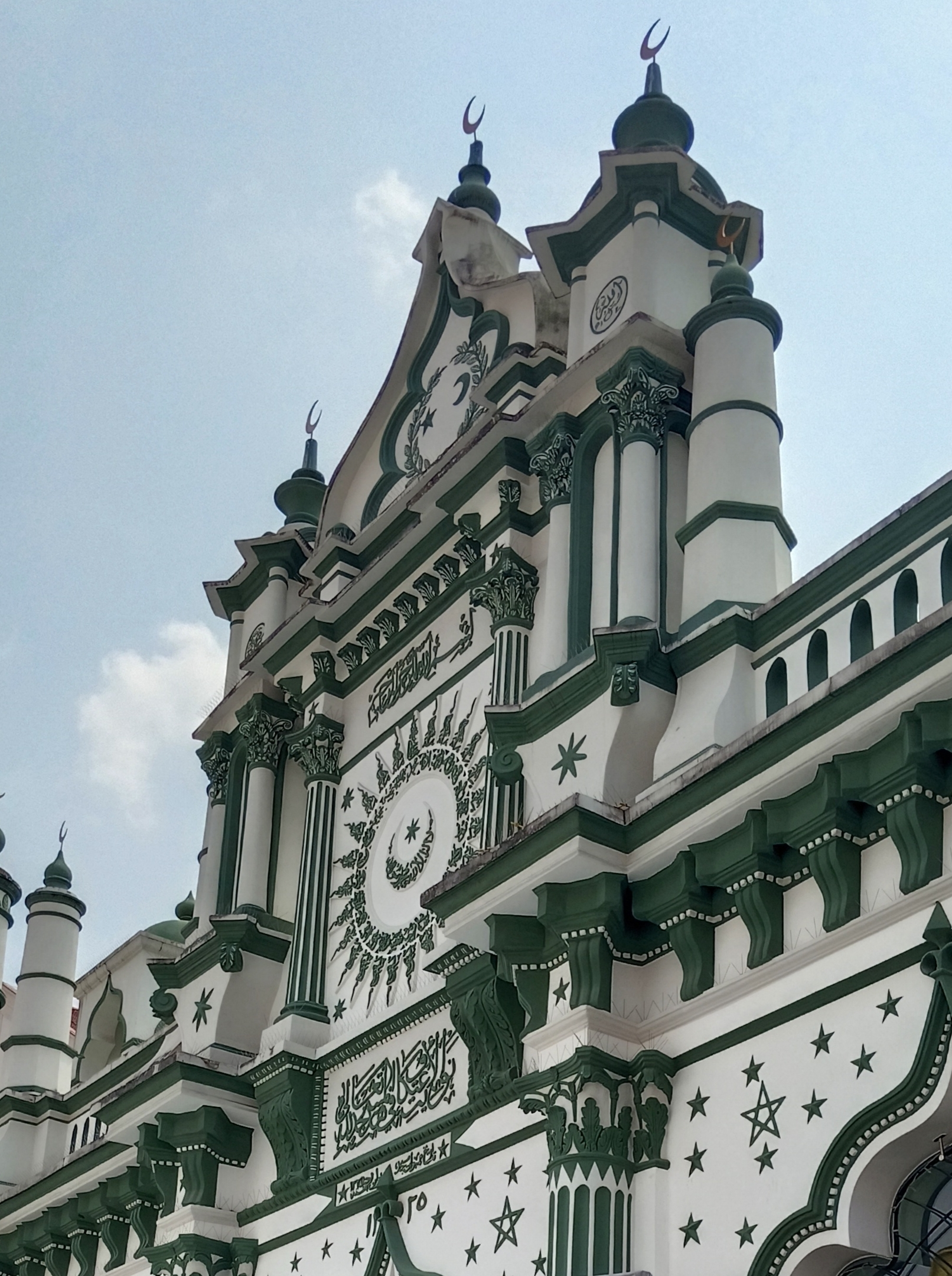
Sundial motif at the entrance of the mosque.

Small, domed minaret-like fixtures surround the corners of the top of the exterior of the mosque. Underneath the main prayer hall is a basement with a wooden floor that can be used as additional space during events that require a larger congregation, such as during Friday prayers and the prayers during the Islamic month of Eid. The main prayer hall is fully carpeted and has an overall capacity of 2,000 worshippers. Most of the mosque, however, is often obscured by the canvas tent setups in the courtyard of the mosque.

Within the mosque compound are several shophouses that function as ancillary buildings as well as a madrasa. These shophouses are also part of the original awqaf endowment by Shaik Abdul Gaffoor, the founder of the mosque.

== Significance ==
Along with the Angullia Mosque, the Abdul Gaffoor Mosque is a heritage site and landmark of Little India, Singapore. It is also one of three mosques in the country that are aligned to the Hanafi school that is the dominant school of thought amongst Indian Muslims, the others being Masjid Moulana Mohamed Ali and Masjid Bencoolen. Overall, the mosque has been regarded by the local Indian Muslim community as being an important site of their heritage and history.

== Gallery ==
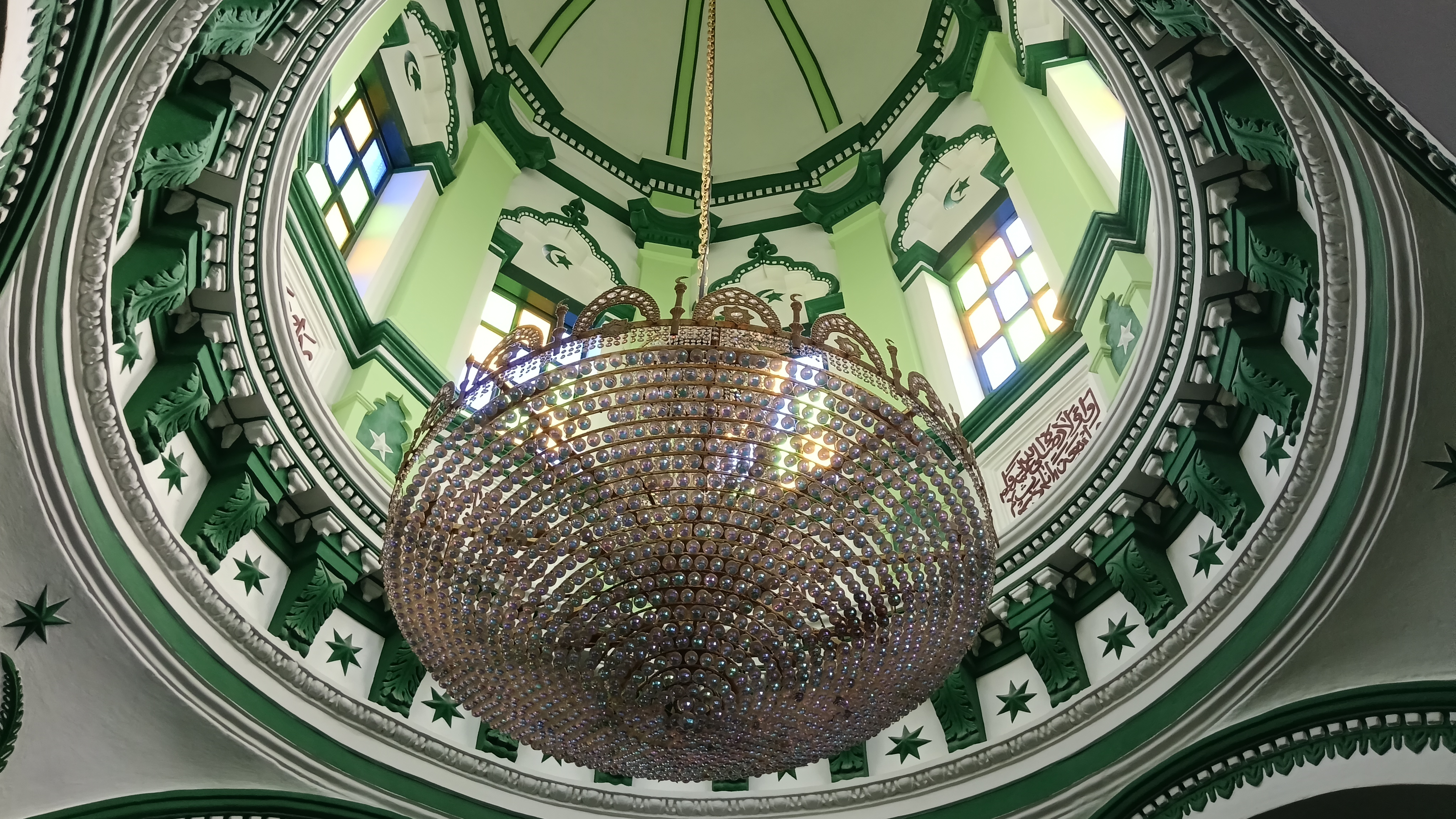
The underside of the dome of the mosque, with a chandelier hanging from the ceiling.

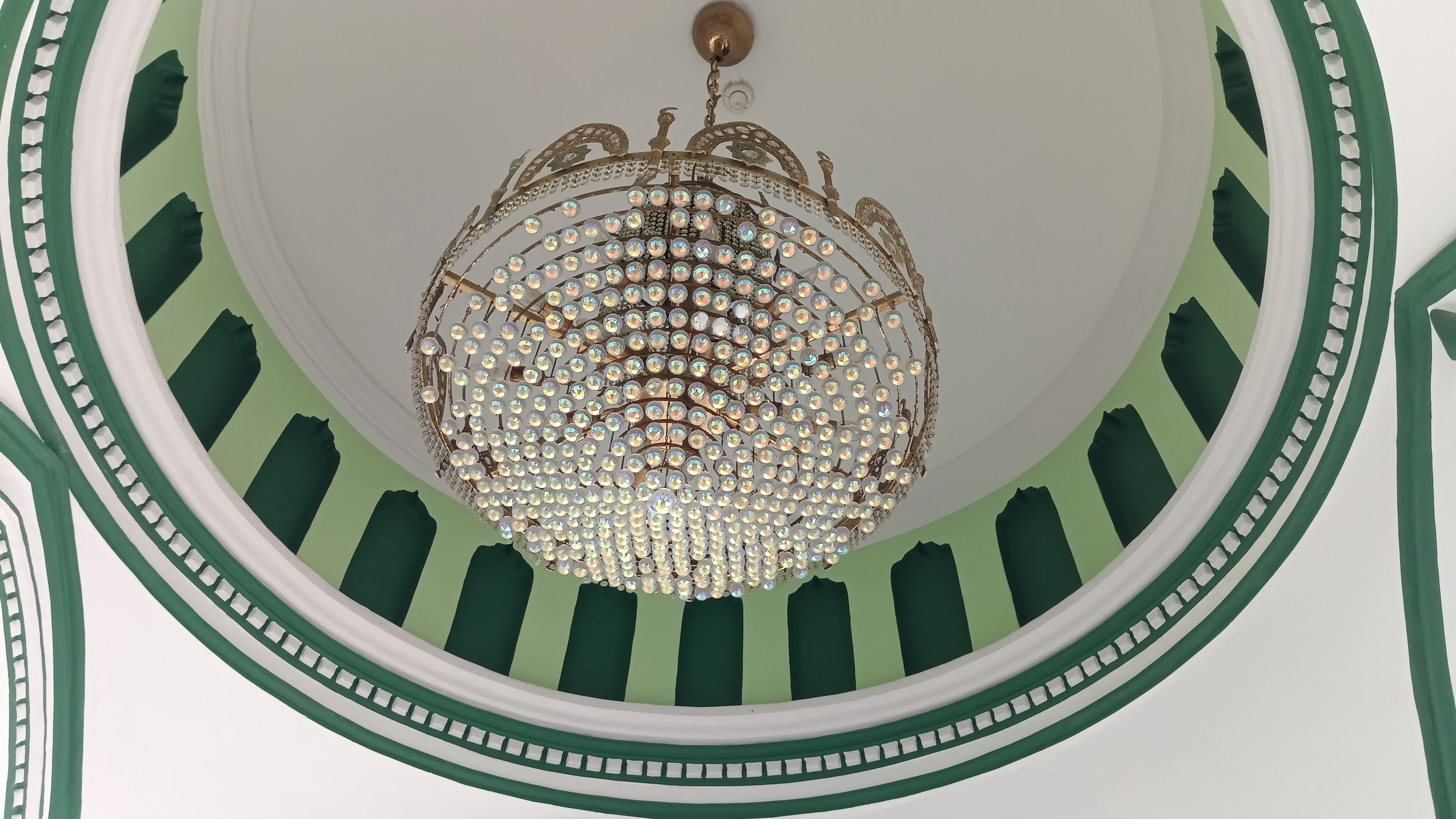
The underside of a cupola over one of the entrances to the basement of the mosque.

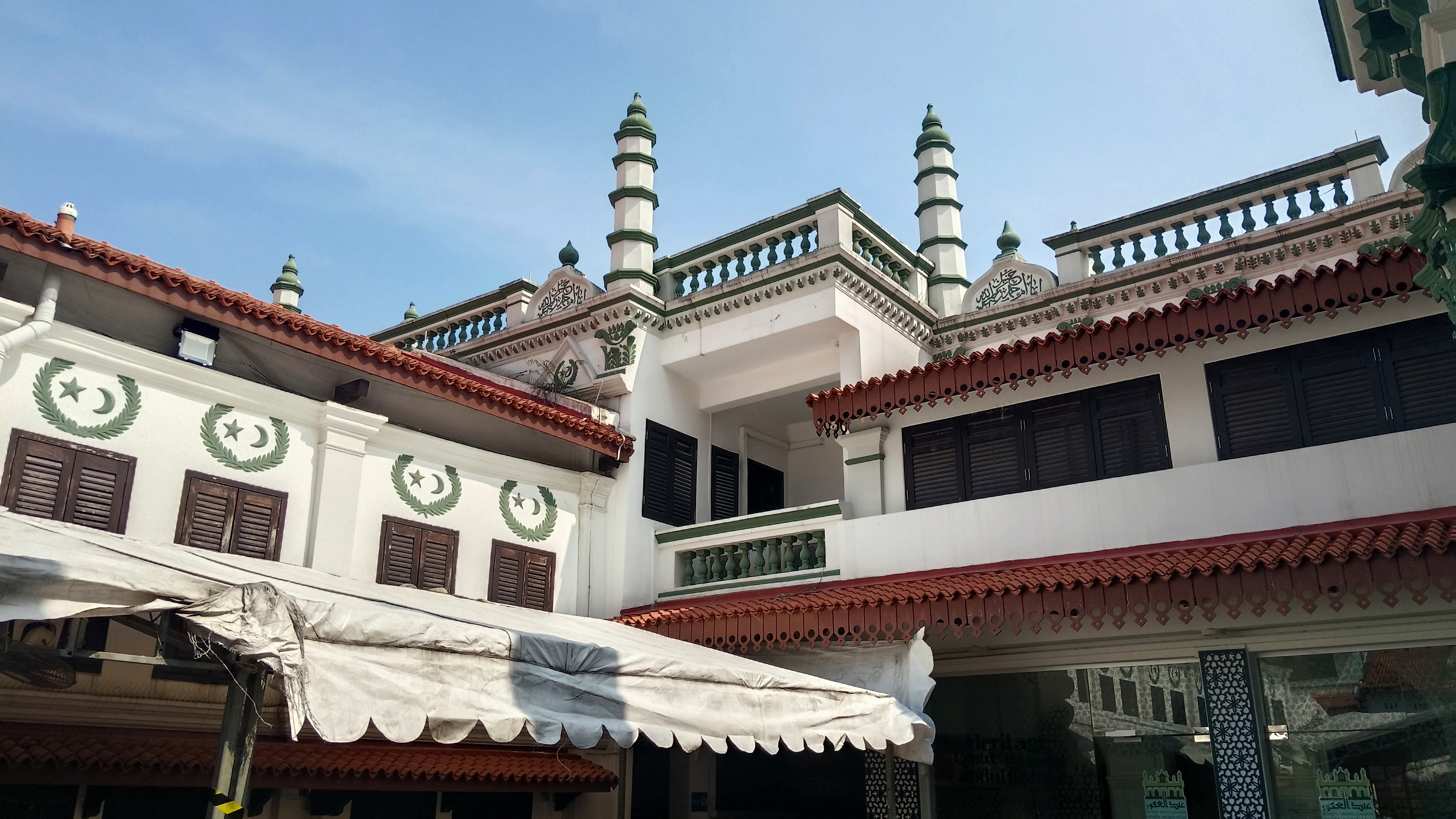
An ancillary building within the compound of the mosque.

== Transportation ==
The mosque is directly accessible from the second exit of Rochor MRT station.

== See also ==
- Islam in Singapore
- List of mosques in Singapore
