= Masjid Moulana Mohamed Ali =

Mosque located at Raffles Place, Singapore

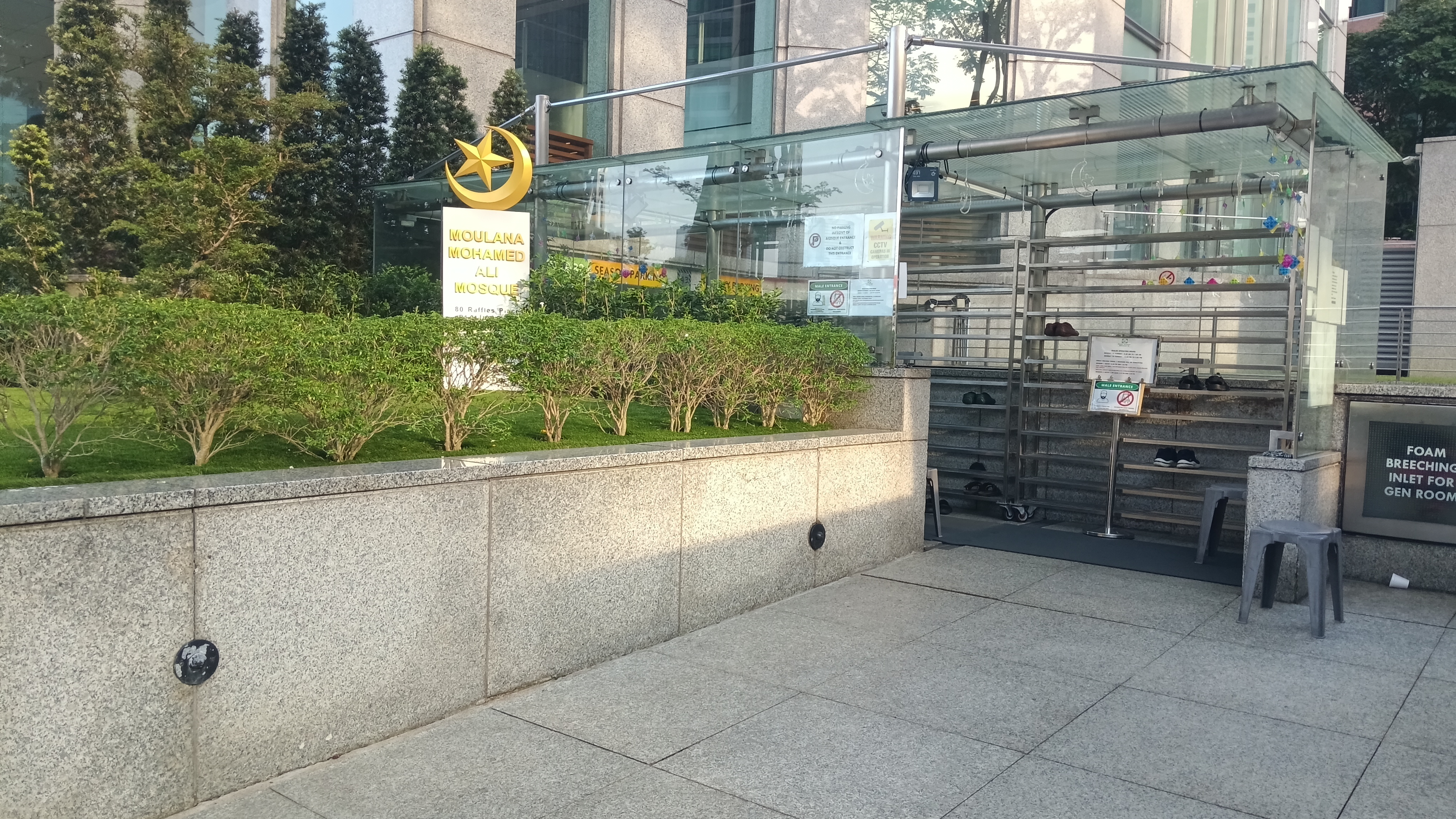
- Main entrance of Masjid Moulana Mohamed Ali

- Location in Singapore

Religion
- Affiliation: Sunni Islam

Location
- Location: 80 Raffles Place, #B1-01, UOB Plaza, Singapore 048624
- Country: Singapore
- Coordinates: 1.2854806°N 103.8501059°E

Architecture
- Type: Mosque, basement
- Style: Modernist architecture
- Established: 1950s
- Completed: 1995

Masjid Moulana Mohamed Ali (Jawi: مسجد مولانا محمد علي; sometimes shortened to Moulana Mohd Ali) is a Sunni Islamic mosque located in the basement of UOB Plaza One in the Downtown Core, Singapore. Completed in 1995, it is the only underground mosque in the country.

== Etymology ==
The mosque is named after Muhammad Ali Jawhar (1878–1931) an Indian Muslim politician who was known as Moulana Mohamed Ali by his Southeast Asian supporters. He was also a founding member of the All-India Muslim League and the Jamia Millia Islamia, as well as a regular member of the Indian National Congress. Jawhar is an honoured figure amongst subcontinental Muslims, with his grave in Jerusalem being a prominent site of visitation.

== History ==
The original mosque committee was formed by three Indian Muslim merchants, who were employed in the Chinatown area. The committee purchased two shophouses along Market Street in Chinatown and converted them into a three-storey mosque for the wider Muslim community of Chinatown. With the expansion of the Central Business District and the Downtown Core area in the late 1970s, Market Street had to be bulldozed, which prompted the committee to negotiate with United Overseas Bank representatives for the relocation of the mosque. Both parties later agreed on re-establishing the mosque in the basement of the proposed UOB Plaza One skyscraper. The new placement of the mosque was also intended to serve as a strategic move to invite curious passersby and office workers into the fold of the Islamic religion, as well as serve as a convenient place of prayer for the Muslim workers in the Central Business District and Shenton Way areas.

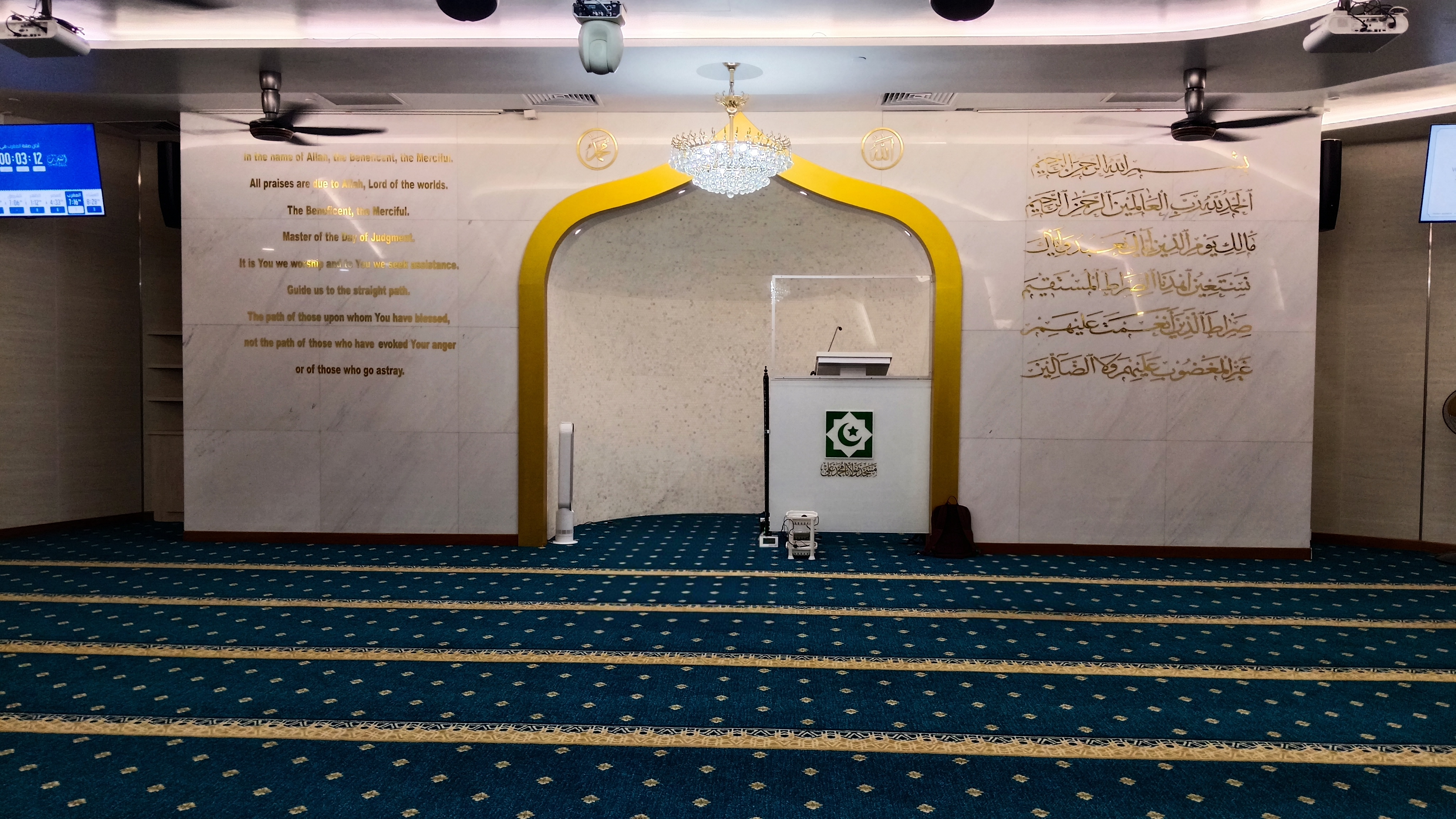
The main prayer hall of the mosque in the evening. Surah Al-Fātiḥah is inscribed on both sides of the mihrab in the English and Arabic languages.

Both the UOB Plaza and the mosque were constructed in tandem, beginning in 1984. The old mosque had been demolished by 1982 and the Friday prayers were instead held at the Nagore Durgha shrine in nearby Telok Ayer. Syed Isa Semait, the contemporary Mufti of the country, visited the incomplete structure on 24 June 1994 to approve that the facade was properly aligned with the qibla. The mosque was ultimately completed in 1995 and was opened to the public on 27 January of that year, although the inauguration ceremony was only held on 1 April 1996.

On 10 April 2015, the mosque was reopened after it had undergone a six-month reconstruction to accommodate more worshippers and improve its ventilation systems. This was the first renovation of the mosque in 21 years since its completion in 1996, with a cost of $1.6 million. Yaacob Ibrahim, then the Minister-in-Charge of Muslim Affairs, was present at the mosque's reopening ceremony.

== Significance ==
Masjid Moulana Mohamed Ali is unique for being the only mosque in Singapore that is located underground. It mainly serves Muslim office workers and janitors in the Central Business District, with activities at the mosque usually being confined to Friday prayers and festive celebrations. Regarding its religious affiliation, Masjid Moulana Mohamed Ali is a Sunni Islamic mosque that caters to both the Shafi'i and Hanafi schools of thought, the latter a minority in the country. It is also one of the few mosques in the country that are Indian Muslim heritage sites, the others including Masjid Jamae at Chinatown and Masjid Abdul Gaffoor at Rochor.

== See also ==
- Islam in Singapore
- List of mosques in Singapore
