= Masjid Bencoolen =

Hanafi Sunni Mosque located along Bencoolen Street, Singapore

Bencoolen Mosque
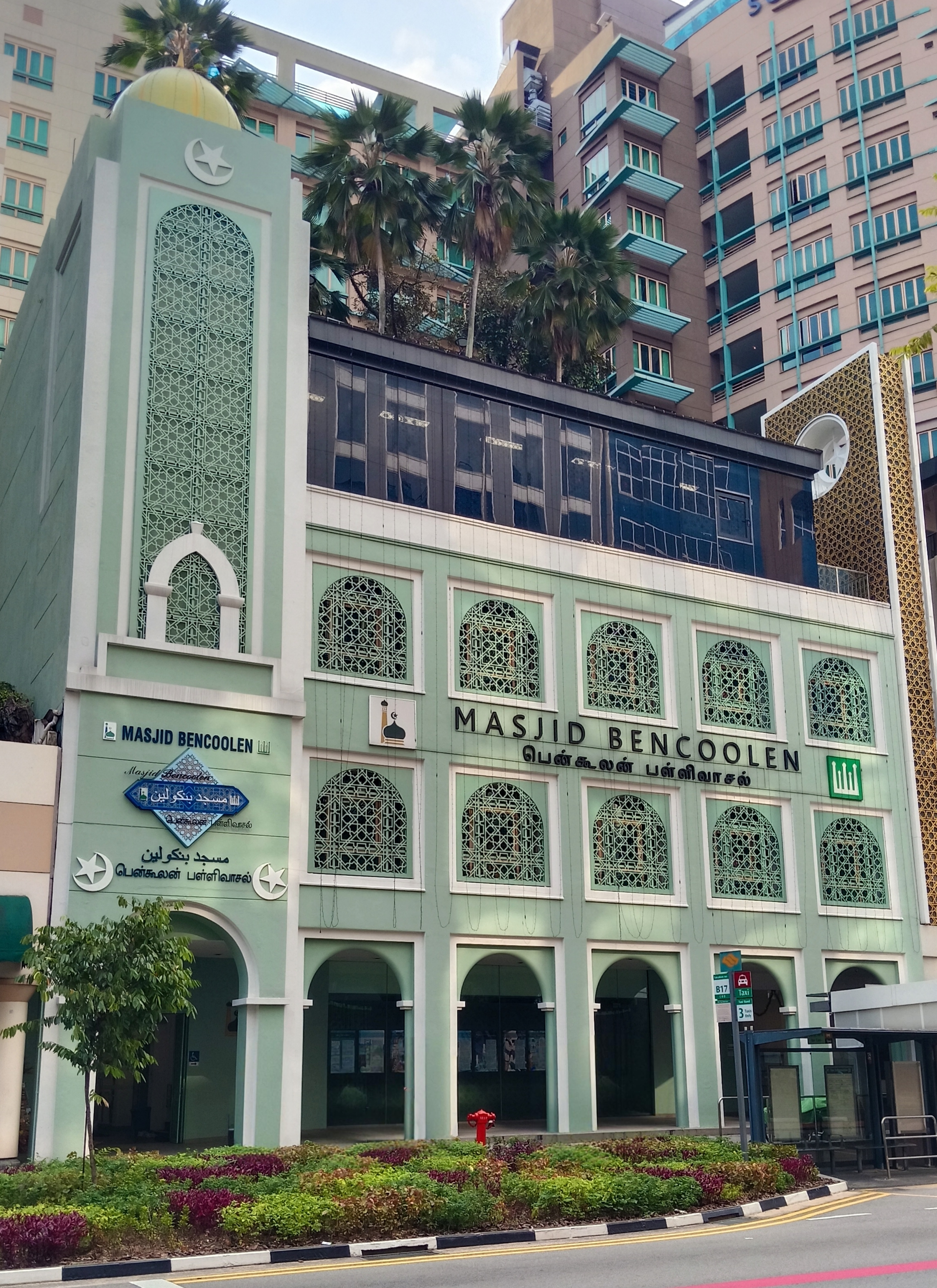
- The Bencoolen Mosque in 2026.

- Location in Singapore

Religion
- Affiliation: Sunni Islam

Location
- Location: 51 Bencoolen Street, Singapore 189630
- Country: Singapore
- Coordinates: 1.2991477°N 103.8503782°E

Architecture
- Type: Mosque
- Style: Islamic architecture
- Established: 1825
- Completed: 1828 (Original); 2004 (First reconstruction); 2023 (Second reconstruction)

Specifications
- Capacity: 1,200
- Dome: 1

The Bencoolen Mosque (Malay: Masjid Bencoolen; Jawi: مسجد بنکولين, Tamil: பென்கூலன் பள்ளிவாசல், romanized: Peṉkūlaṉ Paḷḷivācal; also spelled as Masjid Bengkali, or Bengkali Mosque) alternatively known as the Hanafi Mosque, is a congregational mosque located along Bencoolen Street between Rochor and Bras Basah, Singapore. It was built in the 1820s by Indian Muslim immigrants from Bengkulu. The present-day mosque is a 2004 reconstruction and is integrated with the Somerset Bencoolen hotel that is owned by Ascott International, a subsidiary of CapitaLand. It is also the current headquarters for the Tablighi Jama'at, an Islamic missionary group.

== History ==
The original mosque, Masjid Bengkali, was an attap structure that was built in stages, between the years 1825 and 1828 by Indian Muslim workers from Bengkulu that had been resettled in colonial Singapore by British authorities. In 1845, Syed Omar Aljunied, a prominent merchant from the Aljunied family, demolished the attap structure and rebuilt it from the ground up as a purely brick structure. In 1906, the mosque became known as the Hanafi Mosque and catered to adherents of the Hanafi school of Sunni Islam. After 1968, the Bencoolen Mosque fell under the purview of the Majlis Ugama Islam Singapura (MUIS), which took over the endowment and management of all mosques in the country. The mosque was also permitted to host the Friday prayer and the Eid prayers. The land the mosque stood on was an endowment that later became known as the Wakaff Bencoolen, in a similar fashion to the Wakaff Kassim at Masjid Kassim.

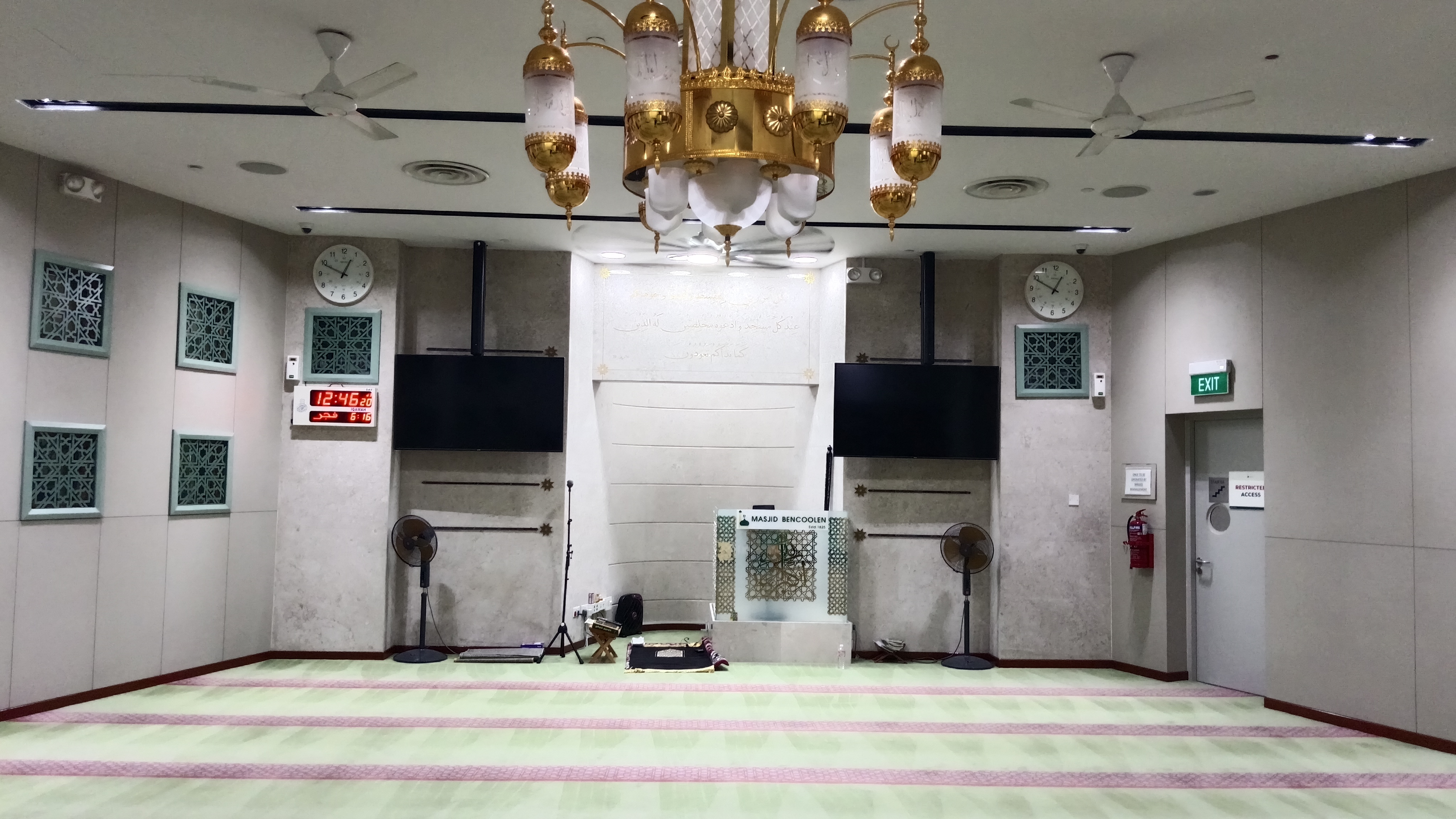
The main prayer hall of the Bencoolen Mosque.

In the 1980s, the Bencoolen Mosque stood in the way of redevelopment plans for Bencoolen Street and Bras Basah. Hence, the MUIS planned to rebuild the mosque as part of a commercial complex, with said complex being a form of income for the mosque. Construction on the new mosque was ultimately completed on 31 March 2004, with the new $4 million mosque being the centrepiece of a new mixed-use complex, the Somerset Bencoolen. Ownership of Somerset Bencoolen was later transferred to Ascott International, a subsidiary of local franchisee CapitaLand, while the mosque itself remained under the purview of the MUIS within the Wakaff Bencoolen territory. The Bencoolen Mosque became the official headquarters of the Tablighi Jama'at in 2018 after the closure of their former headquarters, the Angullia Mosque at Serangoon Road.

In early 2020, the Bencoolen Mosque was closed down to undergo an extensive reconstruction at a cost of $4 million, with a soft reopening on 5 January 2023. The mosque was the fully reopened on the first day of the month of March in the same year. The reconstructed mosque had a capacity of approximately 1,200 worshippers, with the addition of a new youth corner and a kitchen.

== Significance ==
The significance of the Bencoolen Mosque is upheld amongst Indian Muslims in the country who consider it to be a heritage site since its founding in the 1820s. The mosque is also one of three mosques in the country that caters to the adherents of the Hanafi school of Sunni Islam; the other two being Masjid Abdul Gaffoor and Masjid Angullia. This is due to the fact that the doctrine of Hanafism is prominent amongst Muslims from the subcontinent. The Tablighi Jama'at, an Islamic revivalist and missionary movement, uses this mosque as their headquarters with permission from the MUIS, with members conducting annual journeys to propagate the Islamic religion both locally and overseas.

== Transportation ==
The mosque is directly accessible from both the Bencoolen MRT station and the Bras Basah MRT station.

== See also ==
- Islam in Singapore
- List of mosques in Singapore
