= Masjid Maarof =

Mosque located in Jurong West, Singapore

Masjid Maarof مسجد معروف
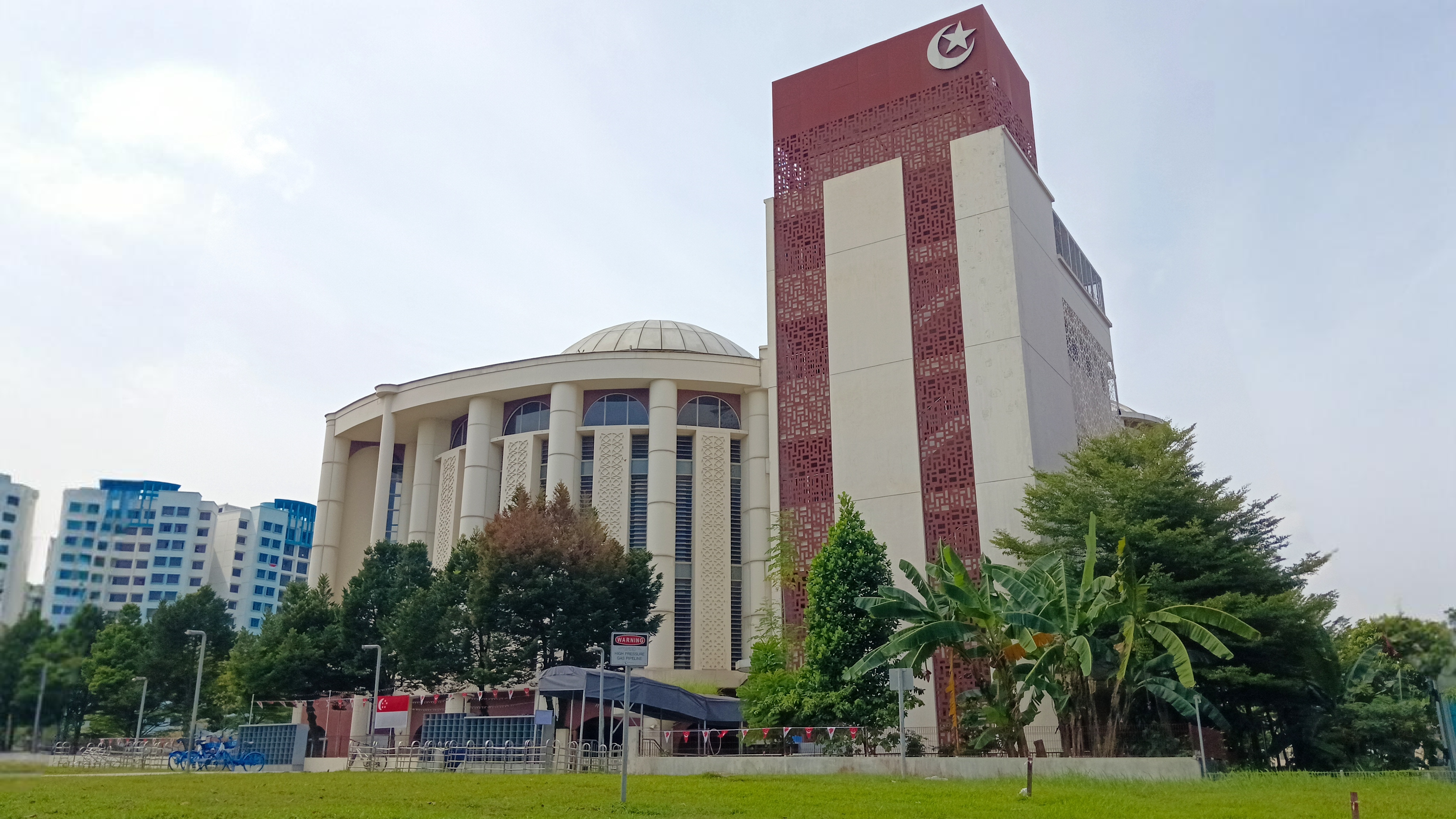
- Masjid Maarof in 2026.

- Location in Singapore

Religion
- Affiliation: Sunni Islam

Location
- Location: 20 Jurong West Street 26, Singapore 648125
- Country: Singapore
- Coordinates: 1.3481339°N 103.7050256°E

Architecture
- Type: Mosque
- Style: Modernist architecture
- Founder: Warees Investments
- Established: 2014
- Completed: 2016

Masjid Maarof (Jawi: مسجد معروف) is a mosque located in Jurong West, Singapore. Built in 2016, its construction is intended as a tribute to an older mosque of similar name that was demolished in 1996. The building features modernist architecture and is situated next to the Jurong Fire Station. It is one of four mosques in Jurong alongside Masjid Assyakirin, Masjid Hasanah, and Masjid Al-Mukminin.

== History ==
Originally, only one mosque, Masjid Assyakirin, served the residents of Boon Lay and Jurong West. With the growing Muslim population in the area, Masjid Assyakirin was not able to contain a larger capacity of congregants, and so the residents of Jurong West instead had to travel to either Jurong East for the mosques Masjid Hasanah and Masjid Al-Mukminin, or to Jalan Bahar for Masjid Pusara Aman. Ultimately, the construction of a new mosque for the residents of Jurong West was announced by the Majlis Ugama Islam Singapura (MUIS) in June 2014. Intended as a tribute to an older mosque, Masjid Al-Ma'arof, which had been demolished in 1996 for redevelopments along Clyde Street, the proposed mosque was named Masjid Maarof after it.

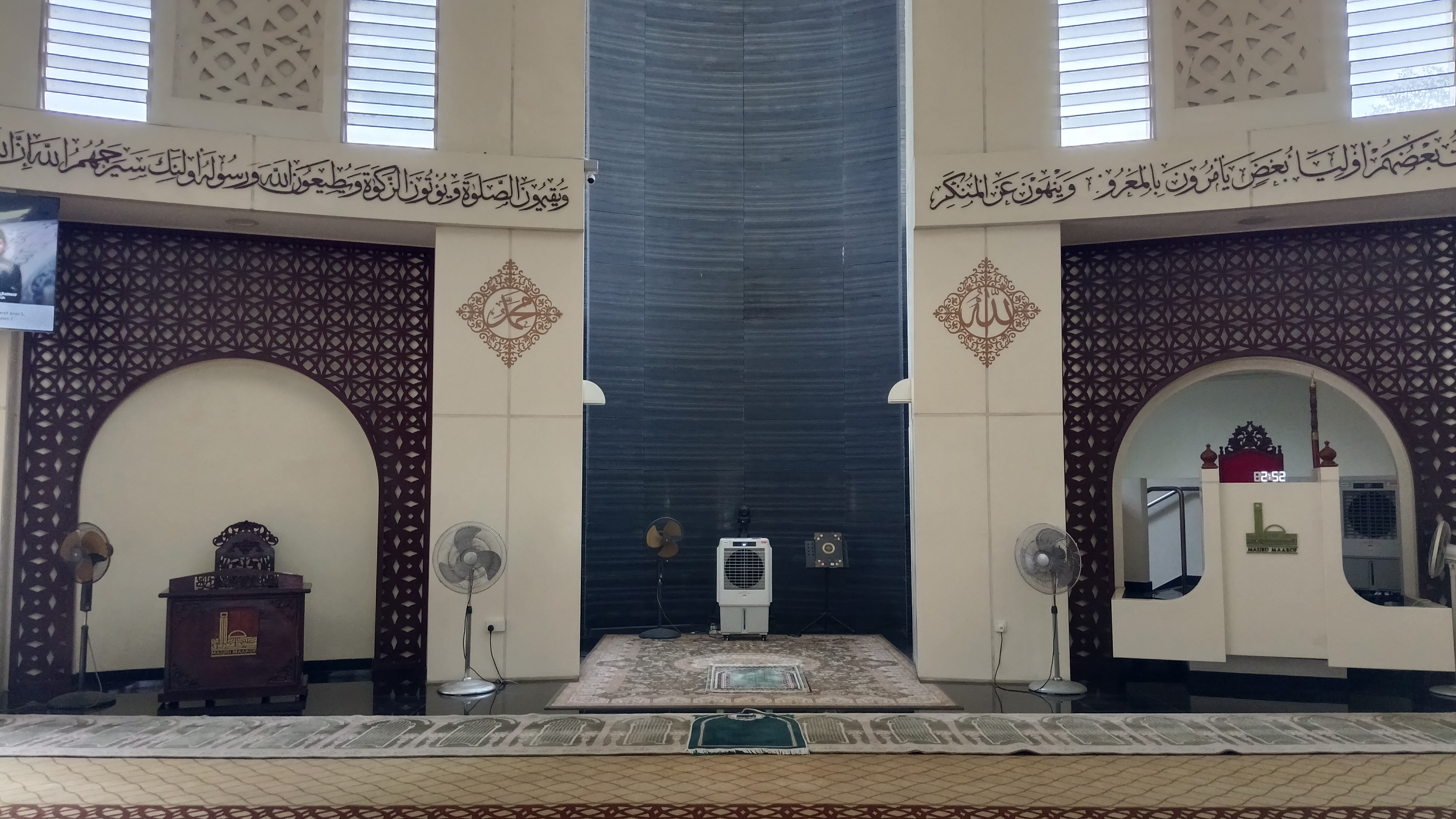
Interior of Masjid Maarof, showing the mihrab and minbar.

Construction on Masjid Maarof began on 6 December 2014. Islamic financial organization, Warees Investments, was assigned with founding the mosque as well as providing a portion of the funding for construction works. The newly formed committee of Masjid Maarof also set up their office in Masjid Assyakirin in mid 2015, as the new mosque was nearing completion. Construction had been mostly completed by 29 April 2016, with the mosque reaching a projected opening date sometime in September. Festive prayers at the void decks under HDB flats in Jurong West were also phased out after the news of the new mosque.

Masjid Maarof was ultimately opened to the public and inaugurated on 19 August 2016 by Yaacob Ibrahim, then the Minister-in-Charge of Muslim Affairs. The total construction cost for the mosque was estimated at $16.8 million. Mainly intended to serve residents living in the Boon Lay and Jalan Bahar areas, Masjid Maarof was also situated next to the Jurong Fire Station and served SCDF personnel as well during Friday prayers and festive events such as Ramadan.

== Architecture ==
Masjid Maarof exhibits modernist architecture with little influence from classical Islamic styles. The building is divided into four levels, with the ground floor being where the main prayer hall and male ablution areas are situated. The second floor of the mosque is where the female prayer hall is situated on a balcony overlooking the main prayer hall, while the third and fourth floors have extra prayer spaces and classrooms. A flat, round dome divided into segments tops the central chamber of the mosque, while the raised sub-section at the side is evocative of a minaret. The mosque can also fit 4,500 worshippers.

== Transportation ==
Masjid Maarof is situated at the junction of Jalan Bahar and Jurong West Avenue, with the nearest MRT station to the mosque being the Boon Lay MRT station on the East–West line.

== See also ==
- List of mosques in Singapore
