= Masjid Al-Mukminin =

Mosque located in Jurong East, Singapore

Masjid Al-Mukminin مسجد المؤمنين
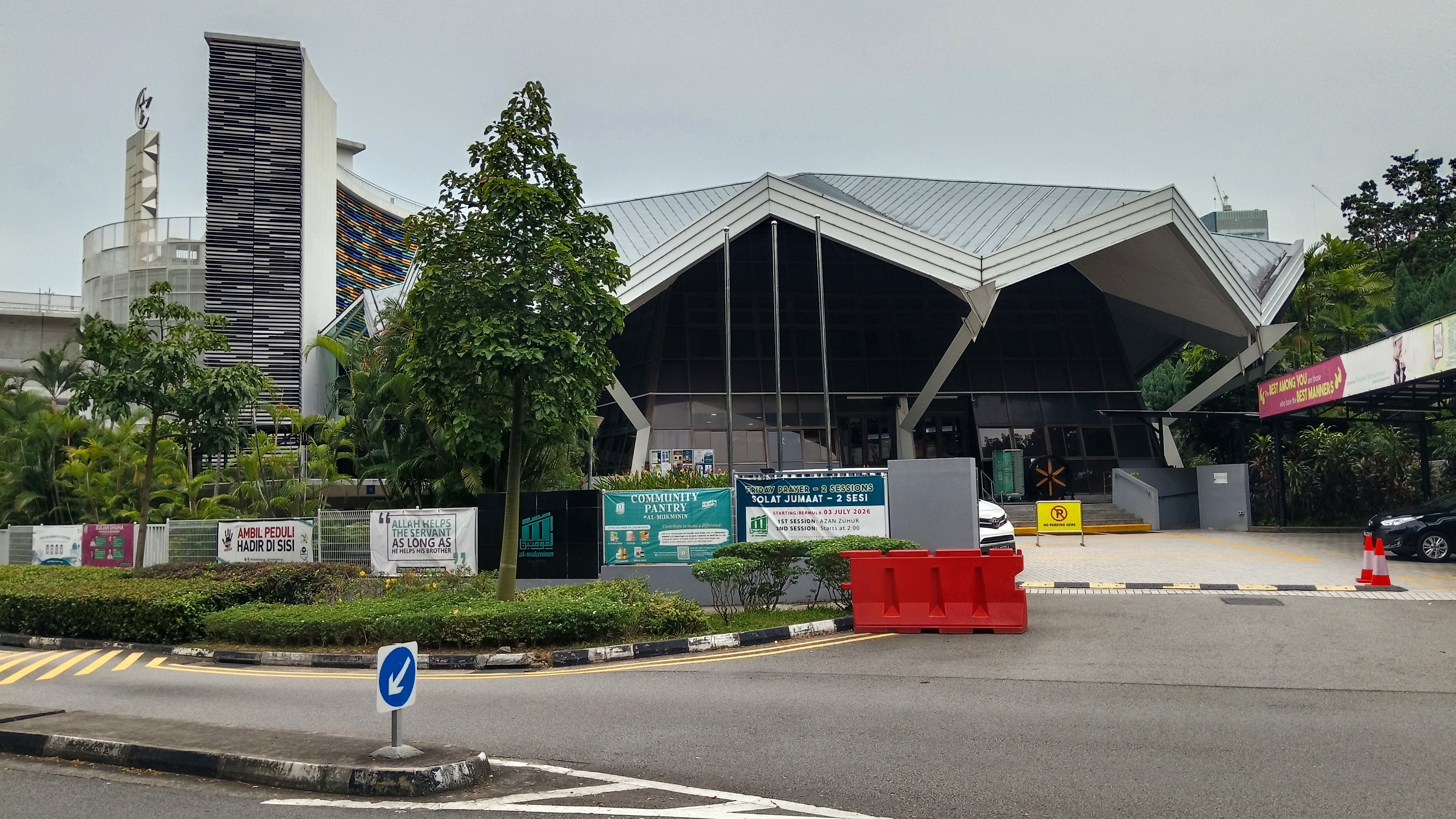
- The main facade of Masjid Al-Mukminin, with the main entrance on the right side of the image.

- Location in Singapore

Religion
- Affiliation: Sunni Islam

Location
- Location: 271 Jurong East Street 21, Singapore 609603
- Country: Singapore
- Coordinates: 1.3392401°N 103.7413172°E

Architecture
- Architect: Mohammad Asaduz Zaman
- Type: Mosque
- Style: Modernist architecture
- Established: 1984
- Completed: 1987

Masjid Al-Mukminin (Jawi: مسجد المؤمنين) is a mosque located in Jurong East, Singapore. Built in 1987, it features modernist architecture inspired by the National Mosque of Malaysia. The mosque is also situated in close proximity with the Jurong East and Toh Guan MRT stations, all within the regional centre of the West Region. It is one of two mosques in Jurong East, the other being Masjid Hasanah at the Teban Gardens enclave.

== Etymology ==
The name of the mosque, Masjid Al-Mukminin, was chosen in September 1982 by the Majlis Ugama Islam Singapura (MUIS). Mukminin is a Malay rendering of the Arabic word Al-Muʼminūn, which means "The Believers" when translated to the English language.

== History ==
In early 1982, plans were confirmed for the construction of a mosque in the residential neighborhood of Jurong East to replace the older suraus and smaller mosques in the area that had been demolished to make way for the establishment of modern housing estates. A flat grassland along Jurong East Street 21 was chosen as the site for the construction of this proposed mosque. The name of the mosque, Masjid Al-Mukminin, out of a series of different conceptual names, was ultimately chosen in September 1982. The MUIS also placed the development of the mosque under the Mosque Building Fund, a non-governmental initiative to assist in the construction of mosques nationwide. To raise funds for the construction of Masjid Al-Mukminin, charity fairs and bazaars were held in Jurong East, with proceeds going to the committee of Masjid Al-Mukminin. Additionally, newspapers were sold through the mosque committee, and a marathon event in the name of the mosque was also held in Jurong East.

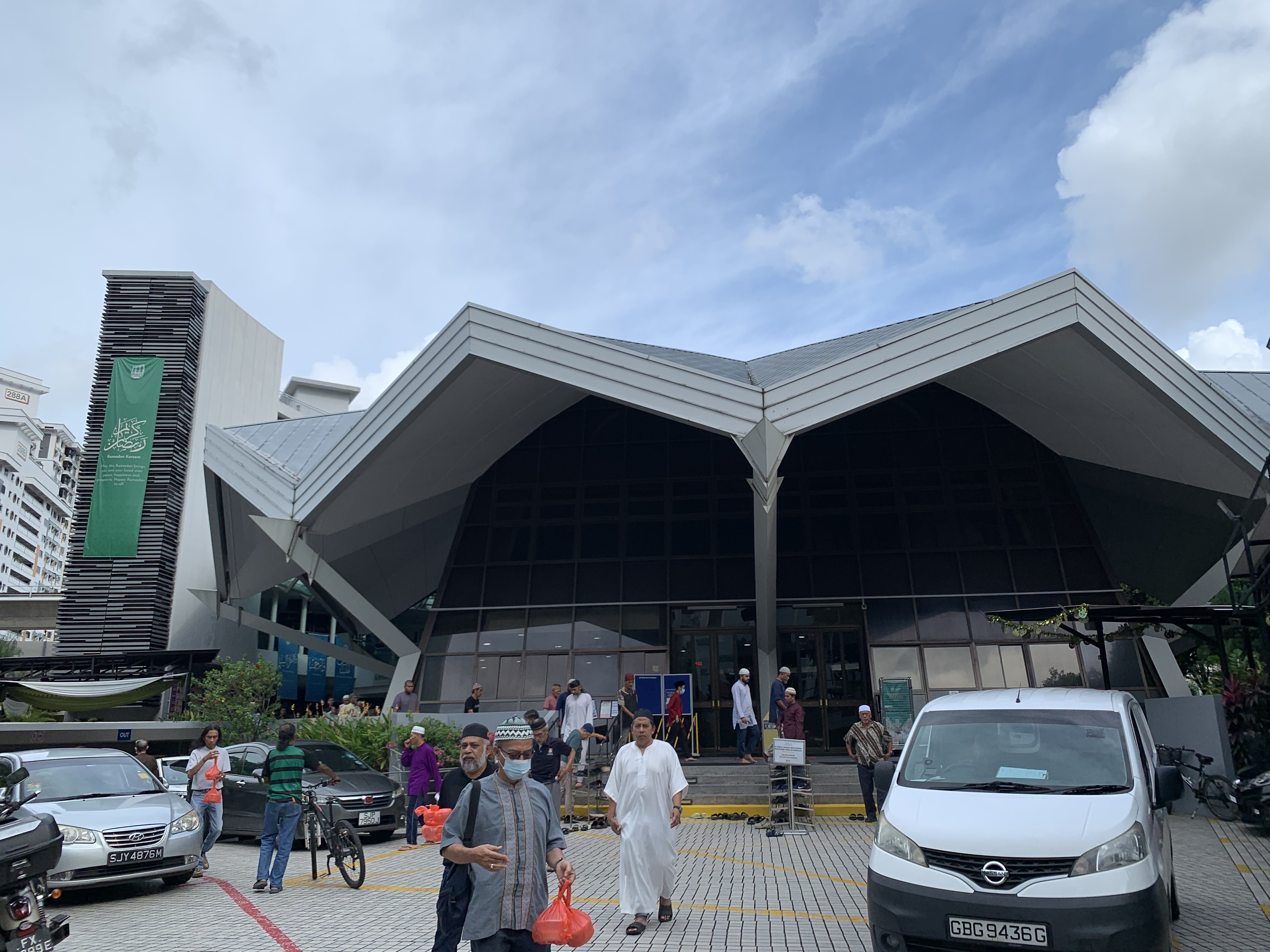
The main prayer hall of the mosque with its ten-pointed star roof.

A first look at the mosque was unveiled to the public in July 1985, in the form of a scale model. Construction on the mosque had started in late 1984 and by early January 1986, it was halfway complete, with an expected opening date of the end of the year. The mosque was ultimately completed in late 1986 and officially opened and inaugurated on 7 June 1987. Residents of central Jurong West would frequent the mosque along with Masjid Hasanah and Masjid Assyakirin in 2000 after the demolition of Masjid Majapahit, an old mosque that serves residents of central Jurong West. The residents of the central parts of Jurong West, however, would not receive their own mosque until 2016, with the construction of Masjid Maarof along Jalan Bahar.

Masjid Al-Mukminin underwent an extensive renovation between 2003 and 2006, which added a new annexe building to the mosque, as well as improved ventilation and new ablution areas for male congregants on the ground floor. The main prayer hall was the only part of the mosque that was retained, while the rest of the mosque including the minaret were demolished and replaced with the large annexe building. The mosque was also reinaugurated on the 1st of September 2006.

== Architecture ==
Masjid Al-Mukminin is built with modernist architecture, featuring a minimalist appearance for its exterior and main facade. The style of the mosque is inspired by the National Mosque of Malaysia, such as the roof over the prayer hall which is a ten-pointed star similar to the roof of the aforementioned mosque. The mosque can fit at least four thousand and five hundred worshippers and has three levels, which also include classrooms, auditorium halls, and pantries with dining areas.

Bangladeshi architect Mohammad Asaduz Zaman was the head designer of the building, under the purview of the Housing and Development Board (HDB). Asaduz Zaman was also one of the architects behind a later HDB construction project in Geylang East, Masjid Darul Aman.

== Transportation ==
Masjid Al-Mukminin is located along Jurong East Street 21 and is within walking distance from the Jurong East MRT station on the East–West MRT line. It is also located directly in front of the Toh Guan MRT station, although this station has not been completed yet, along with the rest of the Jurong Region Line.

== See also ==
- List of mosques in Singapore
