= Pandan Reservoir =

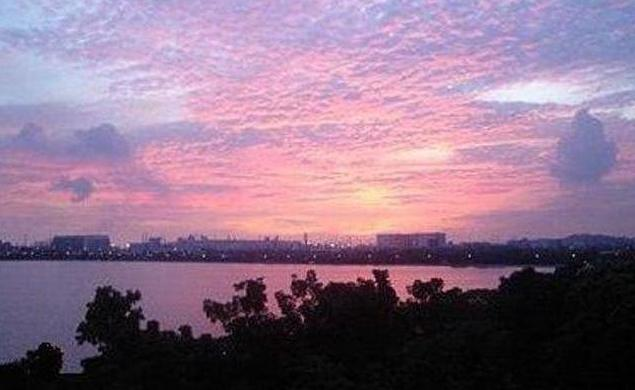
- Sunset view from the nearby Teban Gardens

- Location within Singapore
- Location: West Region
- Coordinates: 1°18′50″N 103°44′30″E
- Type: Reservoir
- Primary inflows: Sungei Pandan
- Primary outflows: Sungei Pandan
- Basin countries: Singapore
- Max. length: Approx 6.1 km (3.8 mi) (perimeter track, gravel)

Pandan Reservoir (Simplified Chinese: 班丹蓄水池; Malay: Empangan Pandan) is a reservoir located in the West Region of Singapore. Formed by damming the mouth of Sungei Pandan, it is the largest service reservoir in Singapore providing non-potable water to the surrounding industrial areas and in particular, the Jurong Industrial Estate. It is currently managed and maintained by the Public Utilities Board of Singapore.

Facing the reservoir on one side is the town of Pandan Gardens and Teban Gardens along West Coast Road, while the industrial areas of Penjuru Road and Jalan Buroh flank the other faces.

It is also home to the Singapore Rowing Association and Easter Rowing Club boathouse, which has its gate along Jalan Buroh. Pandan Reservoir took the name from the area which it is located at Pandan Estate.

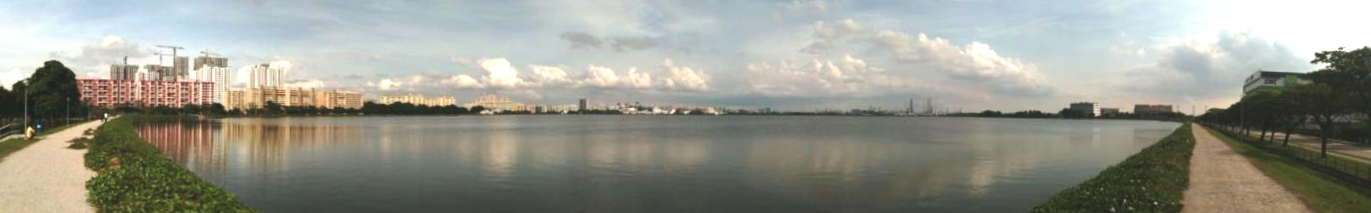
Panoramic view of Pandan Reservoir from Penjuru Road

== Gallery ==
Information Board for Fishing at Pandan Reservoir

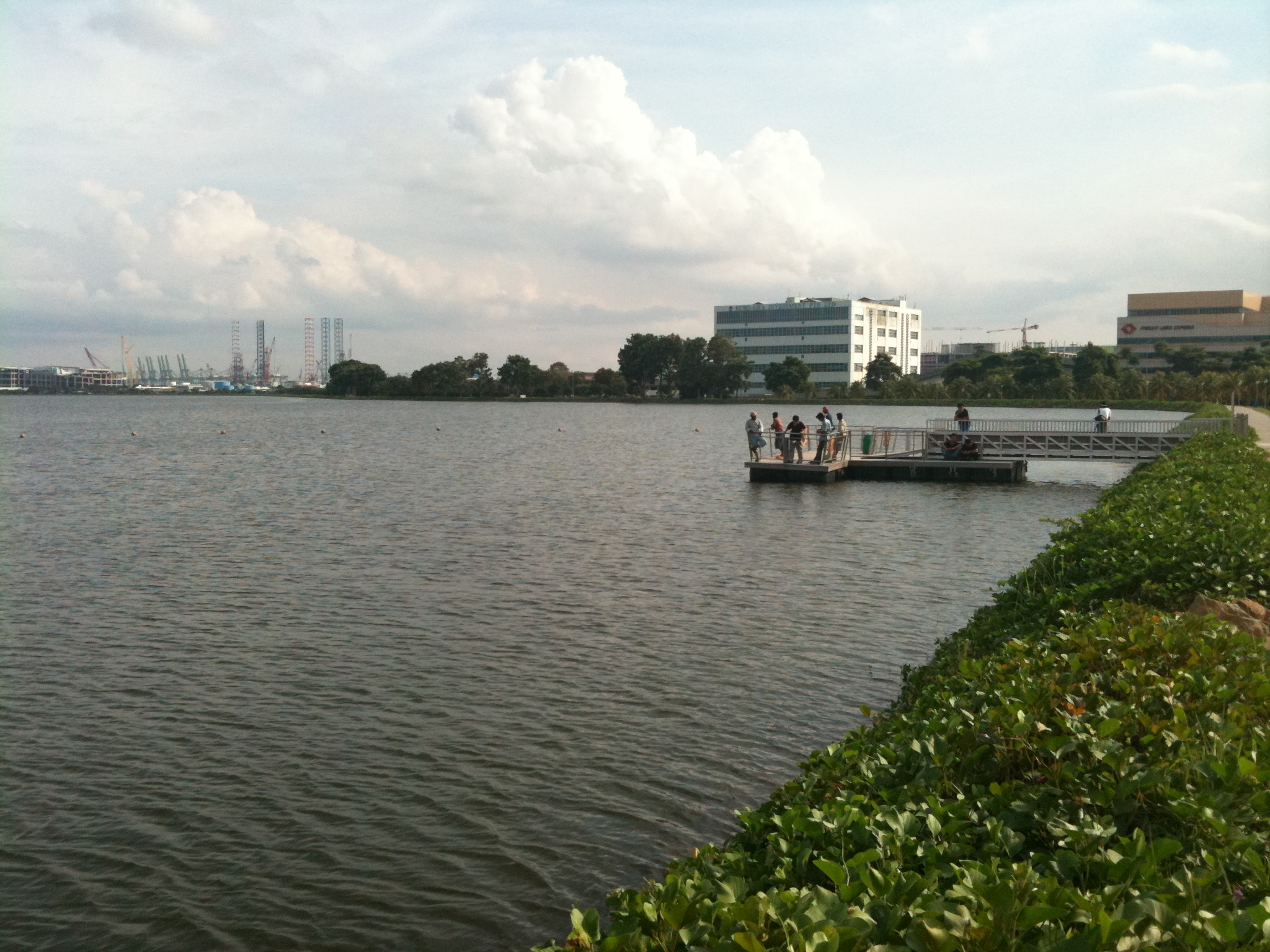
Pandan Reservoir Fishing Jetty on Penjuru Road

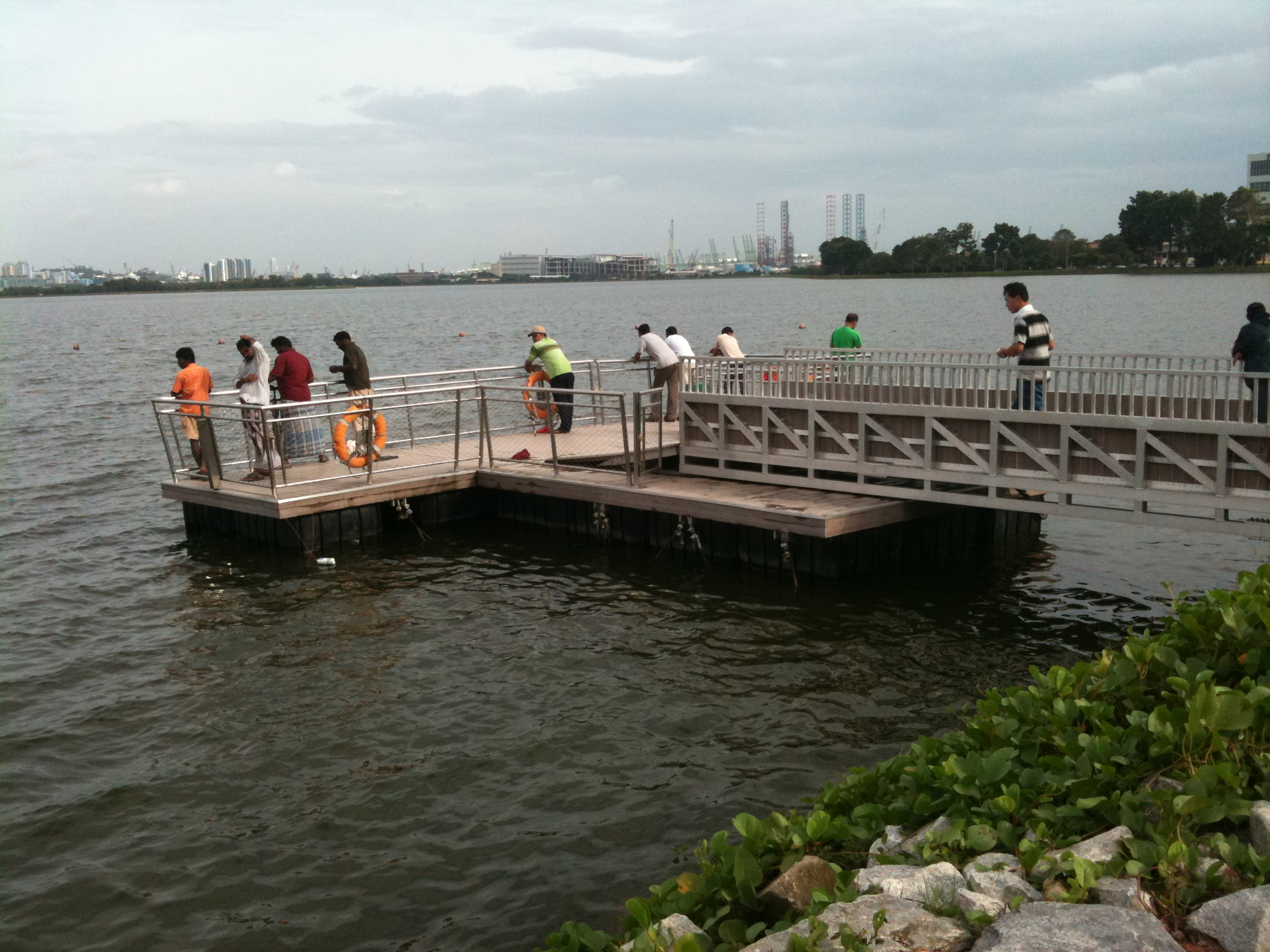
Pandan Reservoir Fishing Jetty on Penjuru Road

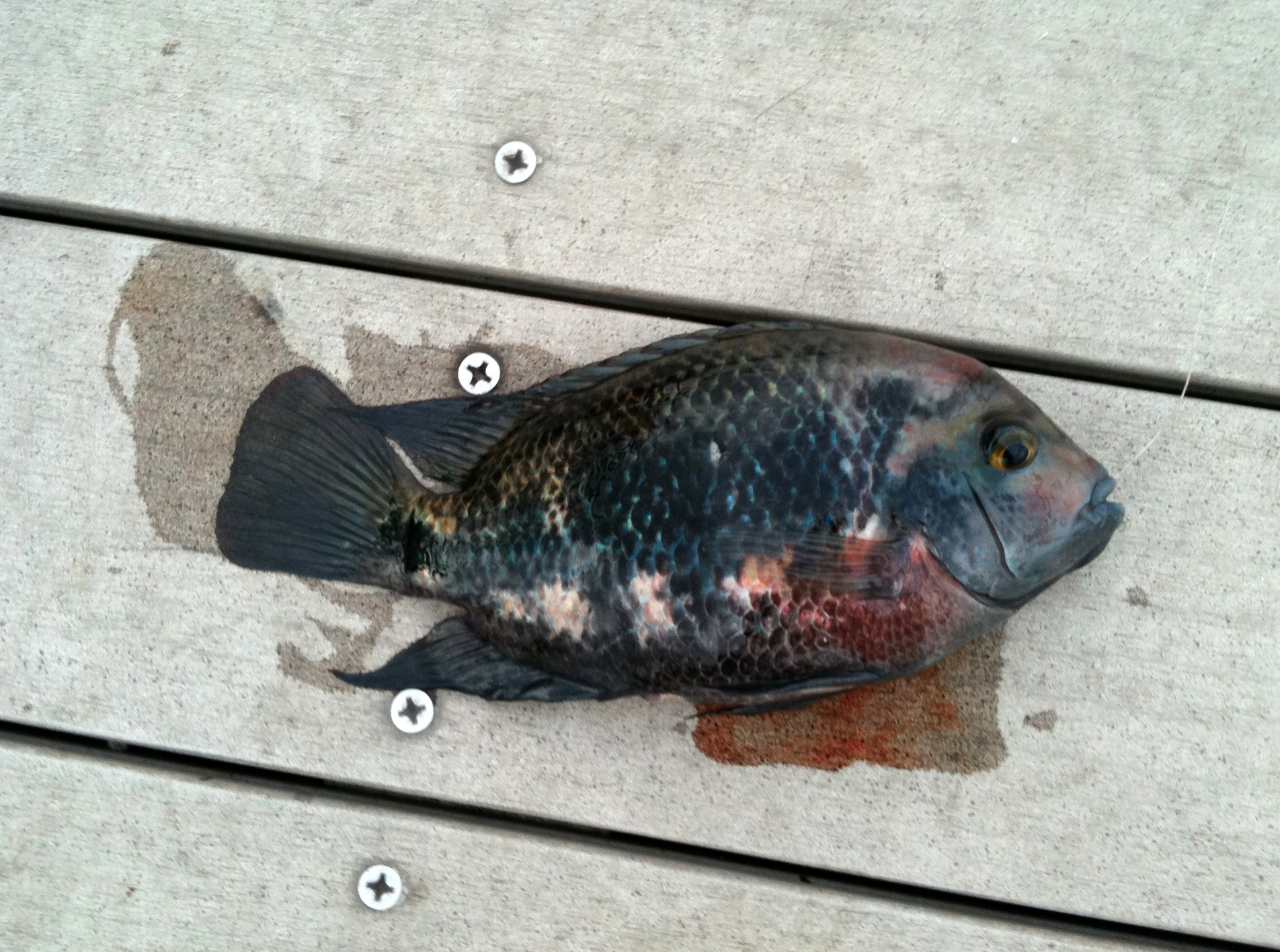
Tilapia caught at Pandan Reservoir

== See also ==
- List of rivers of Singapore
- Rowing (sport)
- Water resources of Singapore
