= Pandan Gardens =

- housing estate

Name transcription(s)
  - Chinese: 班丹花园
  - Pinyin: ban1 dan1 hua1 yuan2
  - Malay: Taman Pandan
  - Tamil: பாண்டான் கார்டன்ஸ்
- Location of Pandan Gardens within Singapore
- Country: Singapore

Pandan Gardens is a housing estate which is part of Jurong East New Town in the West Region of Singapore. Immediately north of Pandan Reservoir and adjacent to Teban Gardens, it comprises exclusively public housing built by the JTC Corporation and Housing and Development Board. Its namesake road connects Jurong Town Hall Road to West Coast Road.

== Geography ==
Like its sister town – Teban Gardens, Pandan Gardens was a patch of mangrove swamp bordering on the banks of Sungei Pandan but was subsequently reclaimed to make way for housing development projects by the JTC Corporation in 1970.

Flanked on the south side by the Pandan Reservoir and the east side by the bank of Sungei Pandan, it sits situated at the fringe of Jurong Industrial Estate as well as being on the crossroad from Singapore's city center and other parts of the island towards the various industrial estates located within Jurong, Tuas and the nearby Jurong Island.

== History ==
The name was derived from the former Malay village in the area, Kampong Sungei Pandan. Although the land reclamation of the estate began in 1970, the actual construction did not commence until after 1975 as the land needed time to settle after being reclaimed from the mangrove swampland of the Sungai Pandan. JTC Corporation undertook the construction of the public housing blocks in the estate as a means to provide additional housing for the families of the workers from the nearby areas of Jurong Industrial Estate. This was done to help ease the housing problem due to overcrowding in the then nearby Taman Jurong housing estate, which was also built by JTC in 1969.

The first housing block was completed around 1978 with a running sequence from block 401 through 416 (both blocks 415 and 416 are four-storey shophouses). Currently, Pandan Gardens and Teban Gardens are satellite towns to the nearby Jurong East New Town.

== Amenities ==
=== Places of Worship ===
- Yang Tao Yuan Sheng Hong Temple (杨桃园城隍庙)
- Gailee BP Church
- Calvary Pandan Bible Presbyterian Church

=== Community Centre ===
The precinct's community centre (Ayer Rajah Community Club) is located beside blocks 416 and 415.

=== Recreation ===
Pandan Gardens offers a variety of recreational facilities, including the Pandan Gardens Leisure Park and Pandan Gardens Park Connector, which runs along the Pandan River.

The area was once home to the Pandan Gardens Swimming Complex, located at 200 Pandan Gardens. Opened in 1979, the facility was closed in 2003 due to declining usage. The site, now occupied by PeopleUp@Pandan, is now an enrichment complex with amenities targeted at families with children. The area has been identified as a potential location for Singapore's only Olympic-sized ice rink, with construction scheduled to start in March 2025 and be completed by end-2026.

== Public transport ==
Pandan Gardens is accessible via public transport service by taking Bus services 51 or 143 to the Jurong East MRT station and the Jurong East Bus Interchange, while Ayer Rajah Expressway provides it with a well connected road access.

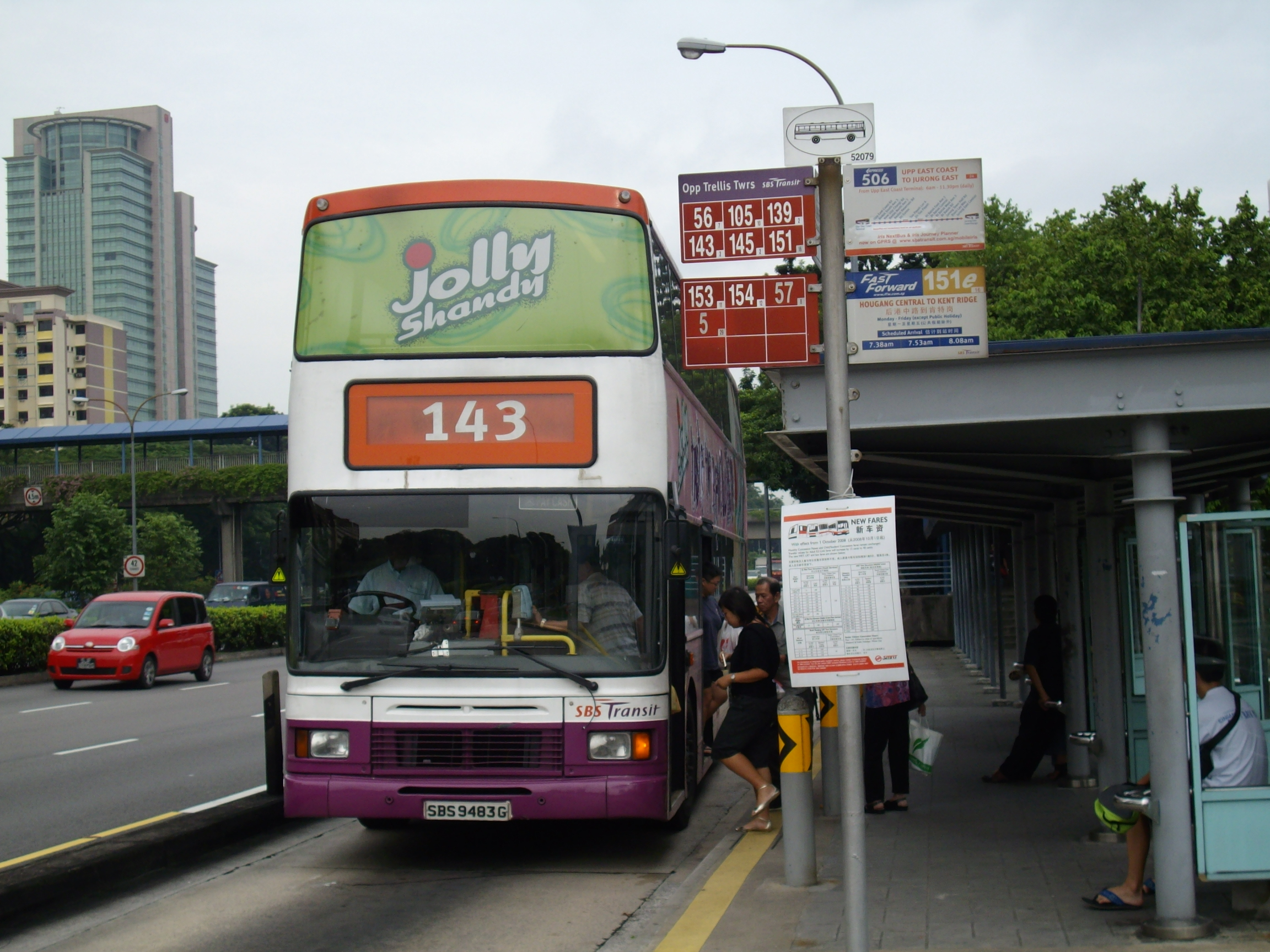
SBS Transit Service 143

Nearest MRT station

- NS1 EW24 JE5 Jurong East MRT station (1988 – present)
- JE7 Pandan Reservoir MRT station (future)

Nearest bus interchange

- Jurong East Bus Interchange (1988 – present)

Bus services serving the town

- SBS Transit service number: 30, 51, 154, 197, 198, 201, 655
- SMRT Buses service number: 176
- Tower Transit Singapore service number: 78, 79, 143, 143M
- City Transit service number: 762

== Public schools ==
- Commonwealth Secondary School (Nov 2006–present).

== Politics ==
Pandan Gardens was part of the now-defunct Ayer Rajah Single Member Constituency (SMC), which falls under the West Coast-Jurong West Group Representation Constituency (GRC), a rename from West Coast GRC in 2025. Ayer Rajah was led by former People's Action Party (PAP) MP Tan Cheng Bock, later a founder of the opposition Progress Singapore Party (PSP), who served as the MP from 1980 to 2006. Ayer Rajah was then absorbed into West Coast in 2006. Tan later returned to contest West Coast in 2020 under the PSP banner, but the PAP team was re-elected narrowly whose team also include then-cabinet minister S. Iswaran and Foo Mee Har, the MP overseeing Ayer Rajah at the time. In 2025, Cassandra Lee took over retiring MP Foo in managing Ayer Rajah, after their PAP team was re-elected in West Coast-Jurong West GRC.

== See also ==
- Taman Jurong
- Jurong
- Jurong East
- Jurong Lake
- Pandan Reservoir
- Teban Gardens
- West Coast Drive
