= Masjid Assyakirin =

Mosque located in Taman Jurong, Singapore

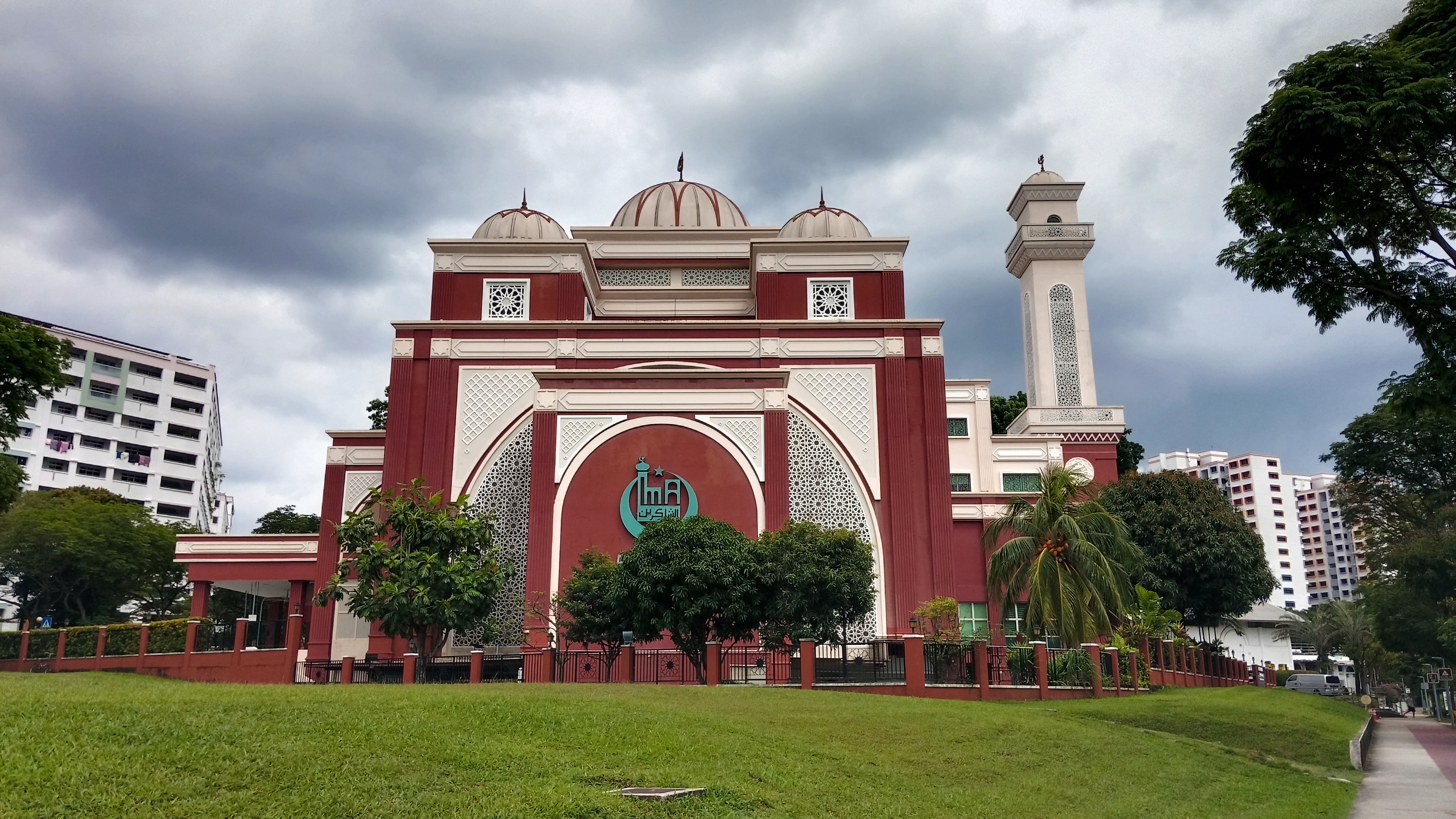

- Location in Singapore

Religion
- Affiliation: Sunni Islam

Location
- Location: 550 Yung An Road, Singapore 618617
- Country: Singapore
- Coordinates: 1.3355762°N 103.7193767°E

Architecture
- Type: Mosque
- Style: Modern, Malay architecture
- Completed: 1977 (original structure); 2002 (current building)

Specifications
- Minaret: 1
- Minaret height: 24 metres

Masjid Assyakirin is a mosque located in the Taman Jurong residential precinct within Jurong, Singapore. Built in 1977, it is the only mosque that is situated in the Taman Jurong area.

== History ==
Masjid Assyakirin was completed in 1977 and inaugurated on 30 April 1978. It was the first and only mosque to be built in the new Taman Jurong residential precinct. Aside from the main prayer hall and basic ablution rooms, a madrasah and a funeral parlour were also built inside the structure to further serve the Muslim residents in the area. In 1983, the mosque introduced a service of counselling for Muslim couples, partly due to the high divorce rate at the time. From the years throughout 1984 to 1986, it held conferences and discussions regarding Muslim marriages. By the 2000s, the state of the mosque began to deteriorate, until it was officially decided to completely rebuild the mosque from the ground up. Construction was completed two years later and the mosque was opened on 27 December 2002.

== Architecture ==
Masjid Assyakirin is built from red bricks that are highlighted with white paint. This design choice is to allow the mosque to blend in with the nearby blocks of flats in Taman Jurong. The main prayer hall of the mosque is topped by one large, bulbous dome, followed by two smaller domes on lower platforms flanking it. Inside the mosque, there is a madrasah on the upper levels, as well as a funeral parlour, with a library in the basement. The minaret is 24 meters high and is situated on the left side of the entire building.

== Transportation ==
Masjid Assyakirin is sandwiched between Yung An Road and Corporation Road, while the nearest MRT station is Lakeside MRT station on the East–West line.

== See also ==
- List of mosques in Singapore
