= Taman Jurong =

- Subzone of Jurong West Planning Area & Housing Estate

Name transcription(s)
  - Chinese: 达曼裕廊 (Simplified) 達曼裕廊 (Traditional); Dámàn Yùláng (Pinyin); Ta̍t-bān Jū-lông (Hokkien POJ)
  - Malay: Taman Jurong (Rumi) تامن جوروڠ (Jawi)
  - Tamil: த‌மான் ஜூரோங் Ta‌māṉ Jūrōṅ (Transliteration)
- Country: Singapore

Area
  - Total: 1.48 km^{2} (0.57 sq mi)

Population (2026)
  - Total: 38,080
  - Density: 25,700/km^{2} (66,600/sq mi)

Taman Jurong is a residential precinct in Jurong West, Singapore. The word Taman is Malay for garden or park; which literally translates to "Jurong Garden/Park".

== History ==
Developed in 1963, Taman Jurong is one of the oldest residential precincts in Singapore, built by JTC Corporation (JTC) to house the workforce of the Jurong Industrial Estate. In its early years, Taman Jurong consisted of mostly one- and two-bedroom flats. Larger and high-rise flats were only constructed by JTC in the late 1960s when the town faced rapid growth.

Taman Jurong was home to many of Singapore's pioneering amenities. It was home to the former Taman Jurong Camp, which housed Singapore's first batch of national servicemen in 1967. The former Jurong Drive-in Cinema, Singapore's first and only drive-in theatre, opened in 1971 along Yuan Ching Road, before its closure in 1985.

In 1973, Jurong Stadium was built along Corporation Road, serving as Jurong's first sports venue. Until its demolition in 2020, it hosted several decentralised National Day celebrations in the 1970s and 1980s, and military ceremonies for the Singapore Armed Forces (SAF). Singapore's first ice-skating rink, the Jurong Ice Skating Centre, was also built in Taman Jurong in 1974 along Yuan Ching Road, before its closure in 1978.

== Residential areas ==
The precinct has a good mixture of private and public residential areas.

=== Private residential areas ===
Non-Landed Housing:

- The Lakefront Residences
- Caspian
- Lake Life
- LakeHolmz
- Lakepoint Condominium
- Lakeside Towers
- The LakeGarden Residences (completing in 2027)
- Sora (completing in 2028)

Landed Housing:

- Lakeside Grove

== Transport ==
=== Roads ===
The main roads in the precinct are Corporation Road, Corporation Drive, Yung Ho Road, and Yuan Ching Road, which connects the precinct to the rest of the island through the AYE (exits 15A and 15B), with minor roads (Yung Loh/Ping/An/Kuang/Sheng Roads, Hu/Tao/Ho/Tah/Kang Ching Roads, Corporation Rise/Walk Roads and Japanese/Chinese Garden Roads) winding through the various places in the precinct.

Initially, when first built, all the road names in Taman Jurong were numbered in Malay, from "Taman Jurong 1" to "Taman Jurong 12" (skipping 11). Corporation Road used to go by the name of "Jalan Peng Kang". JTC Corporation renamed these roads to their current names in 1970.

=== Public transport ===
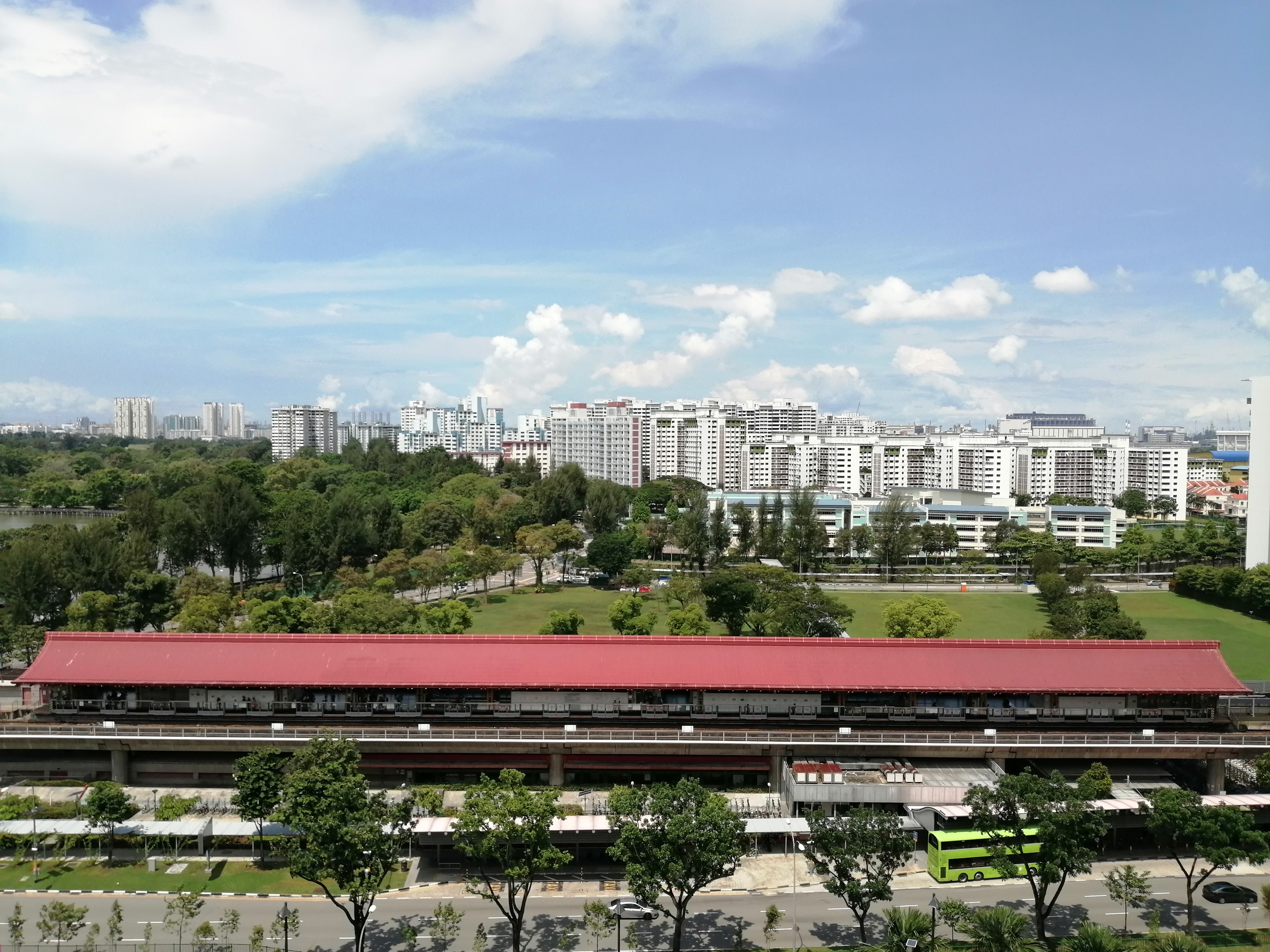
View of Taman Jurong with Lakeside MRT station in the foreground

==== Mass Rapid Transit (MRT) ====
Taman Jurong is served by one MRT station along the East West Line, located along the northern boundary of the precinct, namely:

- EW26 Lakeside

The precinct will also be served by the future CR20 station on the Cross Island Line, which will be located along the southern boundary along Jalan Terusan. The station is expected to open in the late 2030s.

==== Feeder bus services ====
The precinct is linked to Lakeside MRT station through feeder service 240 which runs through the town via Corporation Drive and loops at Yung Ho Road, Corporation Road, Jalan Ahmad Ibrahim and Yuan Ching Road, providing connection to the MRT System for residents staying in the precinct.

==== Trunk bus Services ====
The trunk services in Taman Jurong connects residents staying in the precinct to the other precincts in Singapore. There are 6 trunk services that plies through Taman Jurong via the different roads.
Yuan Ching Road:

- 154 connects residents to Teban Gardens, Pandan Gardens, Clementi, Bukit Timah, Toa Payoh, Potong Pasir, MacPherson, Geylang and Eunos. It also provides direct connection to Jurong Point Shopping Centre.

Corporation Drive:

- 98 connects residents to Jurong Port, Jurong West, Yuhua and Jurong East. It also provides connection to Lakeside MRT station.
- 30 connects residents to Teban Gardens, Pandan Gardens, West Coast, Pasir Panjang, Buona Vista, Telok Blangah, HarbourFront, Tanjong Pagar, Marina Bay, Mountbatten, Geylang, Eunos and Bedok.
- 246 connects residents to Pioneer Sector and Boon Lay. It also provides connection to Lakeside MRT station.
- 49 connects residents to Jurong West Street 51/42/41. It also provides connection to Lakeside MRT station and Jurong East MRT station.

Corporation Road:

- 178 connects residents to Teban Gardens, Yuhua, Bukit Batok, Bukit Panjang, Kranji and Woodlands.
- 79 connects residents to the Pioneer Sector, Jurong Port, Teban Gardens and Jurong East.

== Education ==
There is one primary school (Lakeside), two secondary schools (Yuan Ching and Jurong) and one international school (Yuvabharathi International School) in Taman Jurong.

== Recreation ==
There are five parks in Taman Jurong, namely Jurong Lake Gardens along Yuan Ching Road, Taman Jurong Park at Yung Loh Road, Taman Jurong Greens at Yung An Road, Lakeside Ground Playground at Corporation Walk and a neighbourhood park at Yung Ho Road.

A sports complex, ActiveSG Sport Village @ Jurong Town, is also located in Taman Jurong along Corporation Road, offering facilities for sports such as hockey, football, tennis, pickleball and basketball. Additionally, there is a bowling alley, SuperBowl Jurong, located along Yuan Ching Road.

== Town centre ==
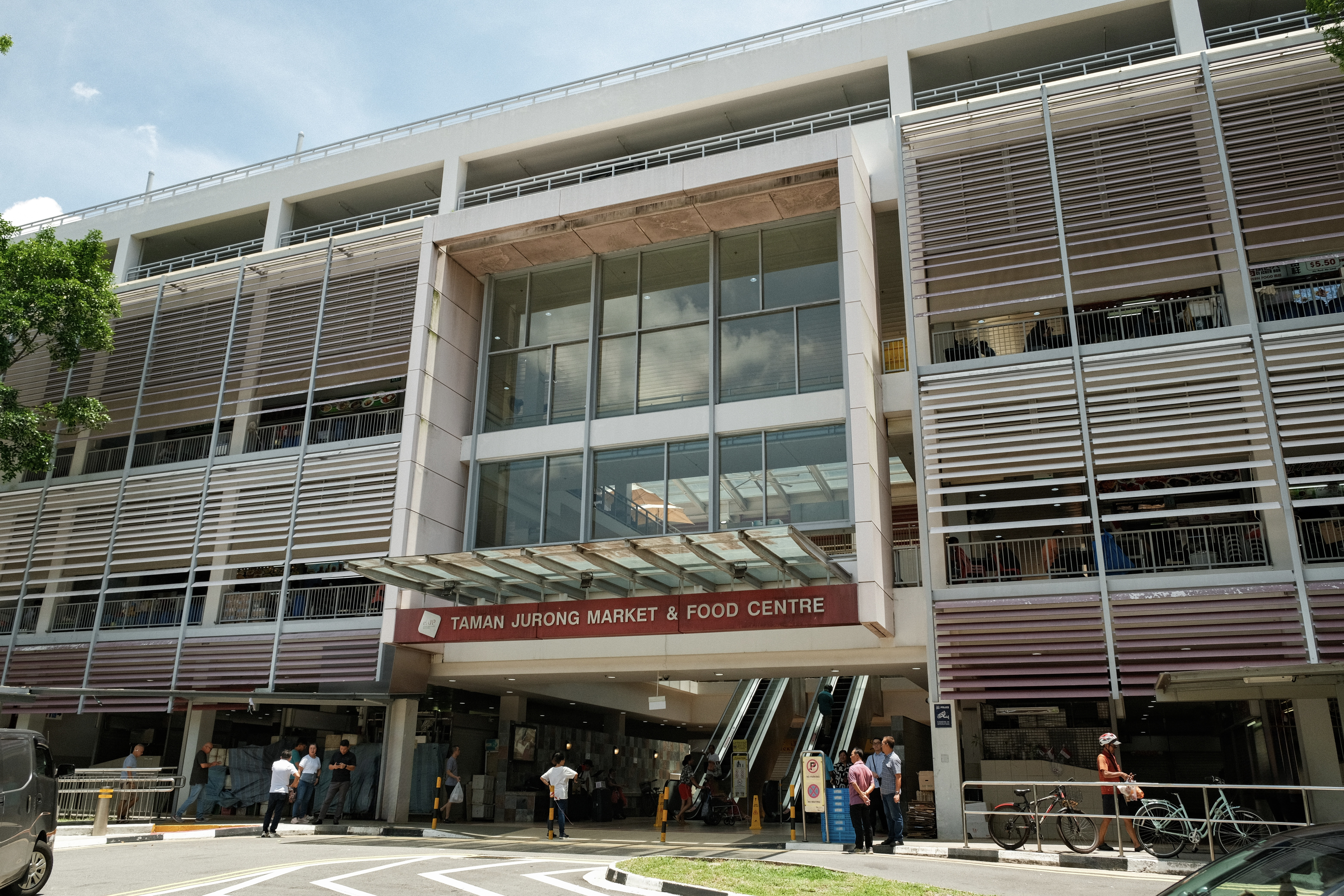
Taman Jurong Market and Food Centre

The town centre is located along Yung Sheng Road, consisting of Taman Jurong Community Club, Taman Jurong Market and Food Centre and Taman Jurong Shopping Centre. It is accessible through all the bus services except 154 and 49.

== Places of worship ==
There is one Chinese temple (Bo Tien Temple), one mosque (Masjid Assyakirin) and three churches (Jurong Christian Church, Calvary Bible-Presbyterian Church and Agape Methodist Church) in this precinct.

== Healthcare ==
Taman Jurong was home to the former Jurong Hospital, located at 235 Corporation Drive. Opened in 1970, it was the only hospital in Jurong West and later renamed to West Point Hospital. The hospital ceased operations in 2018.

The former hospital site will be redeveloped into Taman Jurong Polyclinic, due for completion in 2028.

Like other towns in Singapore, Taman Jurong is also home to many private clinics where General Practitioners (GPs) are available.

== Industrial areas ==
At the southern tip of Taman Jurong, there are two industrial developments, The Agape at the junction of Yuan Ching Road and Yung Ho Road and Corporation Place at the junction of Corporation Road and Jalan Ahmad Ibrahim.

== Politics ==
It is a division of West Coast-Jurong West GRC, with the area's HDB flats under the management of West Coast-Jurong West Town Council and Shawn Huang served as the area's MP as of 2025. Taman Jurong division was first produced during the 2001 Singaporean general election following the formation of the Jurong GRC with former Minister and now-President of Singapore Tharman Shanmugaratnam overseeing Taman Jurong until he left the ward in 2023 to run for the presidential election. As of the 2025 general elections, it was consolidated into West Coast-Jurong West GRC while the remainder of the Jurong GRC becomes Jurong East-Bukit Batok GRC.
