= List of rivers of Singapore =

The geographically small island nation of Singapore has few rivers of significant length or width. The longest of these, the Kallang River, is only 10 km (6.2 mi) in length. The Singapore River, perhaps the most famous in the country, is of a short length as well. However, the country's tropical climate and heavy rainfall require a very comprehensive network of natural draining systems, much of which has become a concrete system as urbanisation spread across the island.

== Natural rivers ==
River	Drainage area(s)	River mouth	Location	Ref.
Alexandra Canal	Bukit Merah, Tanglin	No river mouth. "Alexandra Canal" is the name given to the upstream of the Singapore River.		
Geylang Canal	Geylang	No river mouth. "Geylang Canal" is the name given to the upstream of the Geylang River.		
Geylang River	Geylang, Kallang	Kallang Basin		
Kallang River	Bishan, Central Water Catchment, Kallang, Toa Payoh	Kallang Basin	1°18′N 103°52′E	
Pelton Canal	Geylang, Kallang	Kallang River		
Rochor Canal	Kallang, Rochor	No river mouth. "Rochor Canal" is the name given to the upstream of the Rochor River.		
Rochor River	Kallang	Kallang Basin		
Siglap Canal	Bedok, Marine Parade	Singapore Straits		
Singapore River	Downtown Core, Singapore River Planning Area	Marina Bay		
Stamford Canal (formerly Sungei Brass Bassa)	Central Area (largely underground)			
Sungei Apek	Western Water Catchment	Kranji Reservoir	1.407249°N 103.722590°E	
Sungei Api Api	Pasir Ris, Paya Lebar, Tampines	Serangoon Harbour		
Sungei Bedok	Bedok, Tampines	Singapore Straits		
Sungei Buloh Besar	Lim Chu Kang	Straits of Johor		
Sungei Cina	Woodlands	Straits of Johor		
Sungei Choa Chu Kang	Western Water Catchment	Poyan Reservoir		
Sungei Jurong	Jurong East	Selat Jurong		
Sungei Kangkar	Lim Chu Kang, Western Water Catchment	Kranji Reservoir		
Sungei Ketapang	Tampines	Sungei Bedok		
Sungei Khatib Bongsu	Simpang, Yishun	Straits of Johor		
Sungei Lanchar	Boon Lay, Jurong West	Selat Jurong		
Sungei Mandai	Sungei Kadut	Straits of Johor		
Sungei Pandan	Bukit Batok, Clementi, Jurong East	Selat Jurong		
Sungei Peng Siang	Choa Chu Kang, Tengah, Western Water Catchment	Kranji Reservoir		
Sungei Pinang (Yishun)	Yishun	Lower Seletar Reservoir	1.41455°N 103.85887°E	
Sungei Pinang (Hougang)	Hougang	Sungei Serangoon	1.414217°N 103.859642°E	
Sungei Punggol	Hougang, Punggol, Seletar, Sengkang, Serangoon	Straits of Johor		
Sungei Seletar	Yishun	Lower Seletar Reservoir		
Sungei Seletar Simpang Kiri	Ang Mo Kio, Yishun	Lower Seletar Reservoir		
Sungei Sembawang	Sembawang	Straits of Johor		
Sungei Serangoon	Hougang, Pasir Ris, Punggol, Sengkang	Serangoon Harbour		
Sungei Simpang	Simpang	Straits of Johor		
Sungei Simpang Mak Wai	Lim Chu Kang, Western Water Catchment	Kranji Reservoir	1.412274°N 103.708011°E	
Sungei Tampines	Pasir Ris, Tampines	Serangoon Harbour		
Sungei Tengah	Western Water Catchment	Kranji Reservoir		
Sungei Tho Pek Kong	Western Water Catchment	Poyan Reservoir	1.379549°N 103.682153°E	
Sungei Ulu Pandan	Bukit Timah, Clementi, Queenstown	Sungei Pandan		
Sungei Whampoa	Kallang, Novena	Kallang River		

=== On offshore islands ===
==== Pulau Tekong ====
- Sungei Belang
- Sungei Chek Mat Nah
- Sungei Pasir
- Sungei Permatang
- Sungei Sanyongkong
- Sungei Seminei
- Sungei Unum

==== Pulau Ubin ====
- Sungei Asam
- Sungei Batu Kekek
- Sungei Besar
- Sungei Jelutong
- Sungei Mamam
- Sungei Puaka
- Sungei Pulau Ubin
- Sungei Teris
- Sungei Tiga
- Sungei Wat Siam

== Former rivers ==
=== Dammed and flooded ===
- Sungei Chik Abu - flooded and part of Lower Seletar Reservoir
- Sungei Puaka - flooded and part of Lower Seletar Reservoir
- Sungei Kranji - now the Kranji Reservoir
- Sungei Murai - now the Murai Reservoir
- Sungei Poyan - now the Poyan Reservoir
- Sungei Sarimbun - now the Sarimbun Reservoir
- Sungei Sopok - flooded and part of Lower Seletar Reservoir
- Sungei Tengeh - now the Tengeh Reservoir
