= Geylang East Library =

Public library in Singapore

Coordinates: 1.3174729°N 103.8835454°E

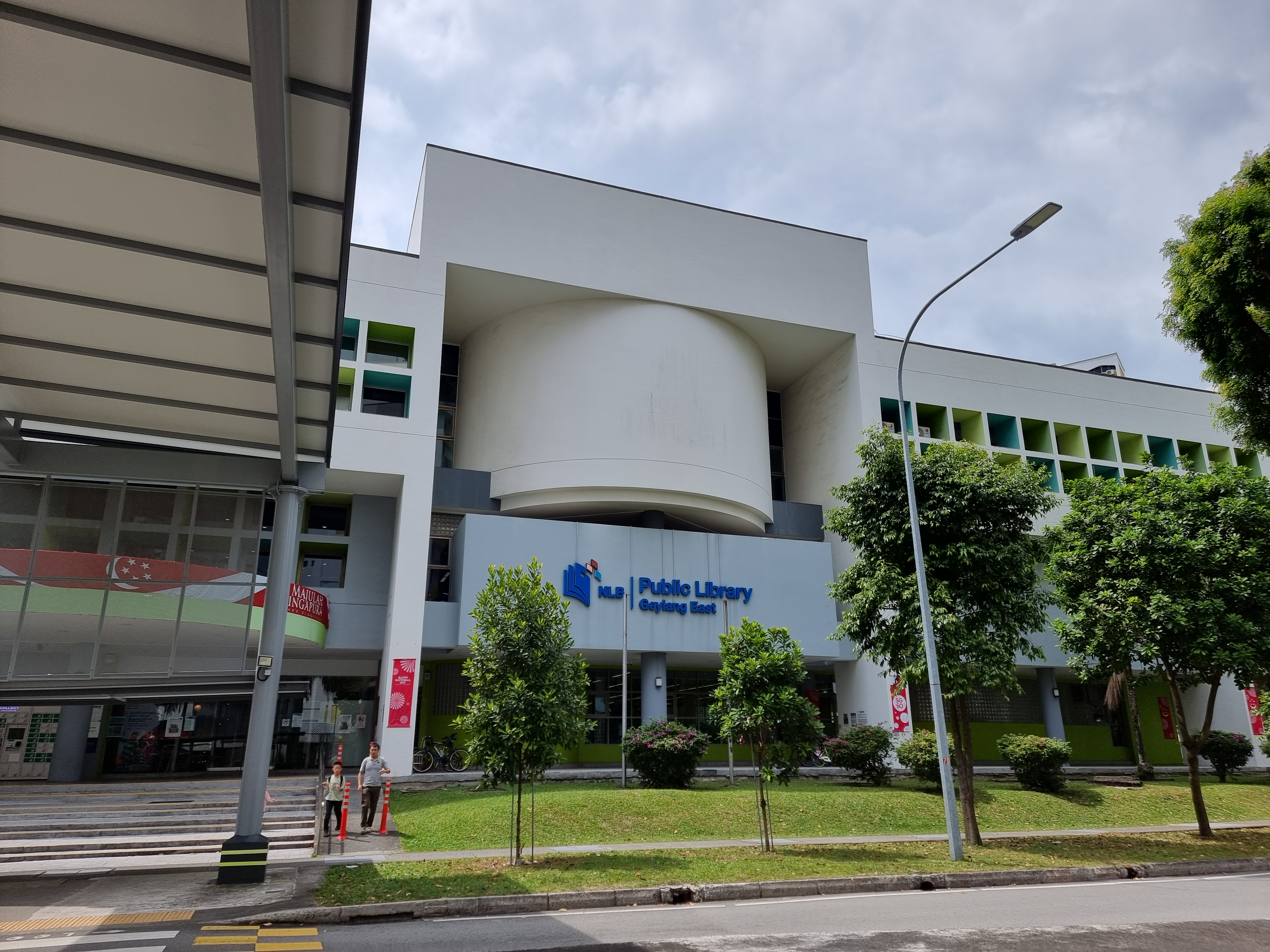
- Geylang East Library in August 2025
- Location: 50 Geylang East Avenue 1, Singapore 389777, Singapore
- Type: Public library
- Established: 26 July 1988; 37 years ago 2030; 4 years' time (New)
- Branch of: National Library Board

Geylang East Library is one of the 26 public libraries established by the National Library Board of Singapore.

Located along Geylang East Avenue 1 within walking distance of Aljunied MRT station, it serves the residents of the Eastern areas of Aljunied, Geylang East, Geylang West, Geylang Serai, Jalan Besar, Eunos, Kampong Ubi, Kallang, MacPherson, Lavender, Kaki Bukit and Sims Drive.

== History ==
Geylang East Community Library was officially opened on 26 July 1988 by Wong Kan Seng, then Minister for Community Development and Second Minister for Foreign Affairs. The library was closed on 18 March 2002 for the installation of the new Electronic Library Management System, and was officially reopened on 29 April that year. Its name was changed to Geylang East Public Library in 2008.

The library is planned to be relocated into the revamped Tanjong Katong Complex in Geylang Serai by 2030.

== Layout ==
Covering an area of 3,817 m^{2}, the library spans three levels and serves the residents of the Eastern areas of Aljunied, Geylang East, Geylang West, Geylang Serai, Jalan Besar, Eunos, Kampong Ubi, Kallang, MacPherson, Lavender, Kaki Bukit and Sims Drive.

=== First floor ===
- Children's collection
- Parenting collection
- Storytelling room

=== Second floor ===
- Young people's collection
- Adult non-fiction
- Adult fiction
- Magazines

=== Third floor ===
- Exhibition halls
- Meeting rooms
- 200-seat auditorium
