= Asian Children's Festival =

Logo of Asian Children's Festival

The Asian Children's Festival (ACF) is an annual event organised by the National Library Board of Singapore and the National Book Development Council of Singapore to promote the habit of lifelong learning and to create and provide opportunities for the creative and joyous learning of Asian content and culture among children. The festival attracts around 500 participants annually.

== History ==
The inaugural event was held in 2000. In 2005, the event was held between 7 and 27 November with the opening at the Woodlands Regional Library. It was held from 15 to 26 November in 2006.

The eighth edition of the festival in 2017 at the Central Public Library. It was organised by the National Book Development Council of Singapore. 57 speakers from 18 countries were invited to the festival, including PJ Lynch and Leslee Udwin. The biennial Scholastic Picture Book Award was also given out to the winner, The Little Durian Tree, during the festival, chosen from 137 entries from Asia. The book was created by a five-man team, students from the Singapore Polytechnic.

During the COVID-19 pandemic in Singapore, ACF was hosted digitally in 2020 and 2021.
