= Aljunied MRT station =

Mass Rapid Transit station in Singapore

Aljunied EW9 阿裕尼 அல்ஜூனிட்
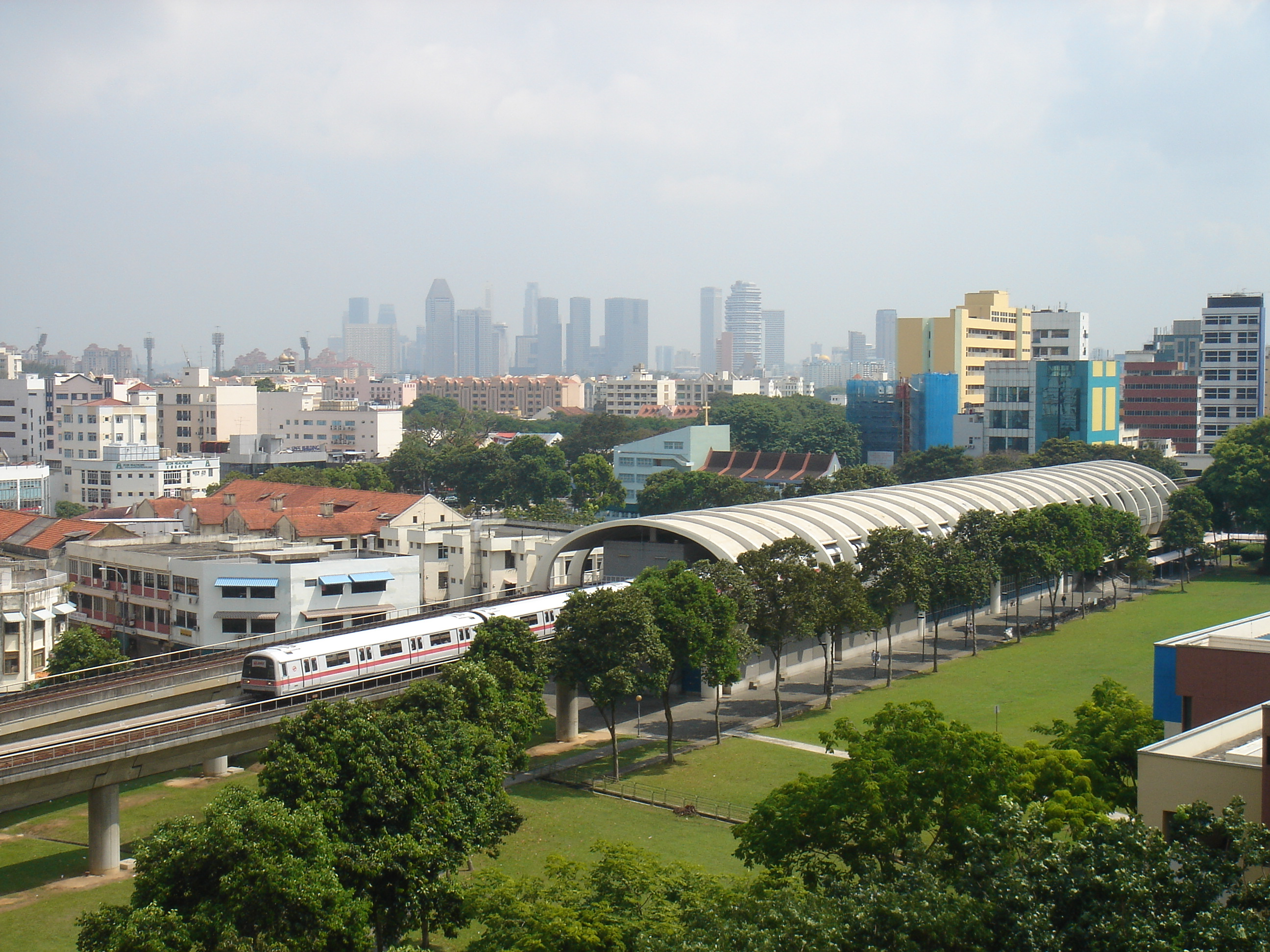
- Aerial view of Aljunied MRT station in 2006

General information
- Location: 81 Lorong 25 Geylang; Singapore 388310
- Coordinates: 1°18′59″N 103°52′58″E
- System: Mass Rapid Transit (MRT) station
- Owner: Land Transport Authority
- Operator: SMRT Trains
- Line: East–West Line
- Platforms: 2 (1 island platform)
- Tracks: 2
- Connections: Bus, taxi

Construction
- Structure type: Elevated
- Platform levels: 1
- Cycle facilities: Yes
- Accessible: Yes (except for Exit B)

Other information
- Station code: ALJ

History
- Opened: 4 November 1989; 36 years ago

Passengers
- June 2024: 21,402 per day

Services
Preceding station	Mass Rapid Transit	Following station
Paya Lebar towards Pasir Ris	East–West Line	Kallang towards Tuas Link
Track layout
Location
- Location within Singapore Rail central area

Aljunied MRT station is an elevated Mass Rapid Transit (MRT) station on the East–West Line (EWL) in Geylang, Singapore. Operated by SMRT Trains, the station serves the eponymous Aljunied subzone of Geylang. Other nearby landmarks include Geylang East Library and Geylang Methodist Primary and Secondary School. Like other stations of the eastern part of the EWL, the station has a dome-shaped segmented roof.

First announced in May 1982, it was to be constructed as part of Phase II of the MRT system. The station opened on 4 November 1989 as part of the MRT eastern line extension to Tanah Merah station. Accessibility enhancements for pedestrian bridges near the station were completed in July 2011 as well as additional bicycle parking facilities in October 2012. Half-height platform screen doors and high-volume low-speed fans were installed by August 2011 and the first quarter of 2013, respectively.

== History ==
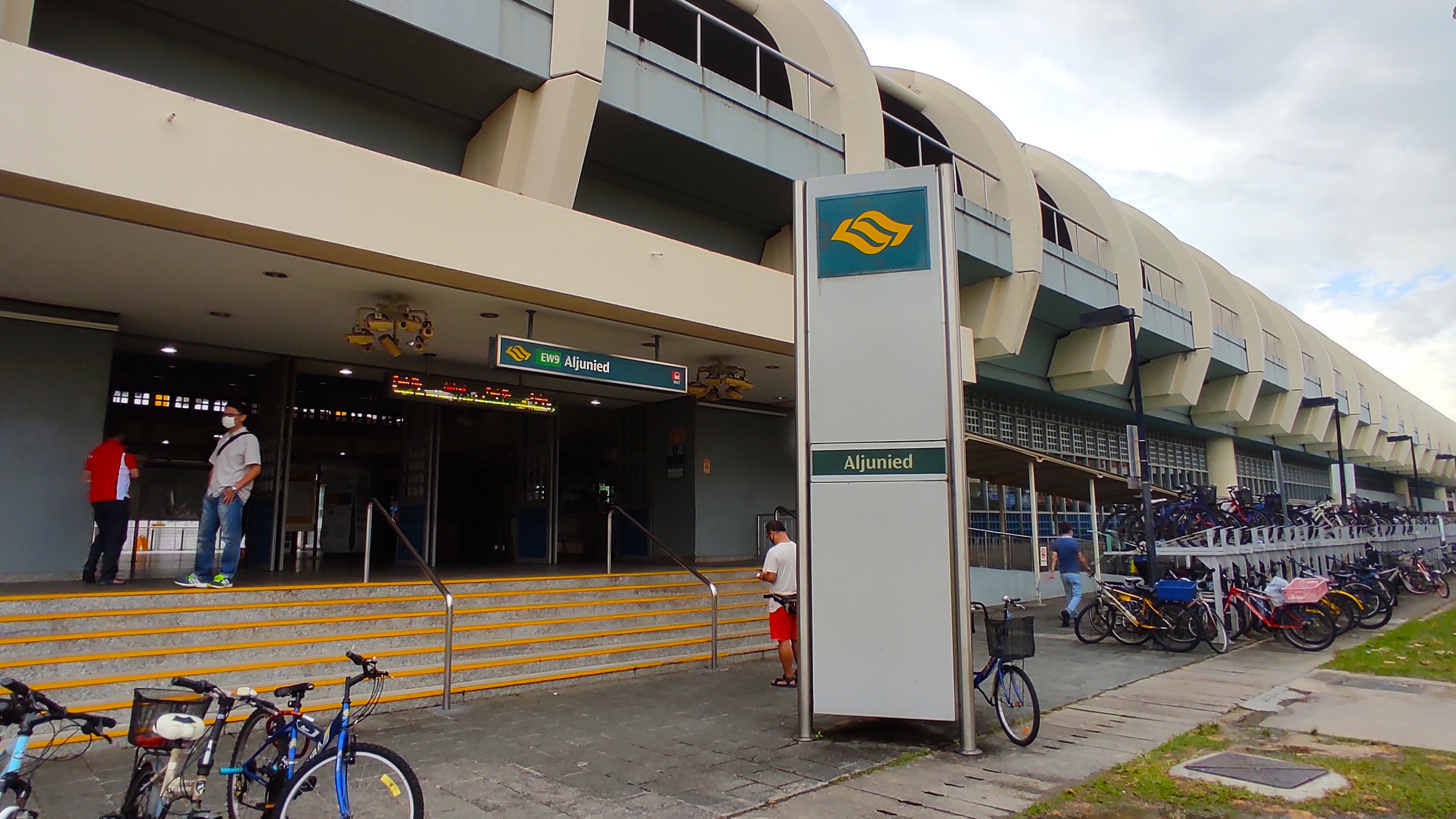
Exit A of the station.

Aljunied station was first announced in the early plans of the MRT network published in May 1982. The station was later confirmed to be part of Phase II of the MRT system in October 1983. Several joint ventures were shortlisted for Contract 302 by May 1985, which covered the construction for this station, the adjacent Kallang station, and viaducts running from Paya Lebar to Kallang, which included a 115 metres (377 ft) segment over the Kallang River.

The contract was awarded to a partnership between Lee Kim Tah Ltd and French company Societe Generale D'Enterprises Sainrapt Et Brice for S$59.52 million (US$27.05 million) in November 1985. Works on the station began in early 1986, and Aljunied opened earlier than expected on 4 November 1989 as part of the MRT segment from Bugis to Tanah Merah.

Aljunied was also among the first batch of ten stations announced in 2010 to have additional bicycle parking facilities as a response to the growing demand of bicycle parking spots. The installation was completed in October 2012. As part of efforts to improve barrier free accessibility for major transport hubs, overhead pedestrian bridges near Aljunied and five other stations had lifts installed. They were installed progressively from the third quarter of 2012 to the end of 2013.

Following a rise in track intrusions as well as commuters slipping when rushing for the train, the Land Transport Authority and SMRT decided to install platform screen doors. Half-height platform screen doors were eventually installed and commenced operations at Aljunied station by August 2011. High-volume low-speed fans were installed in the station by the first quarter of 2013.

== Station details ==
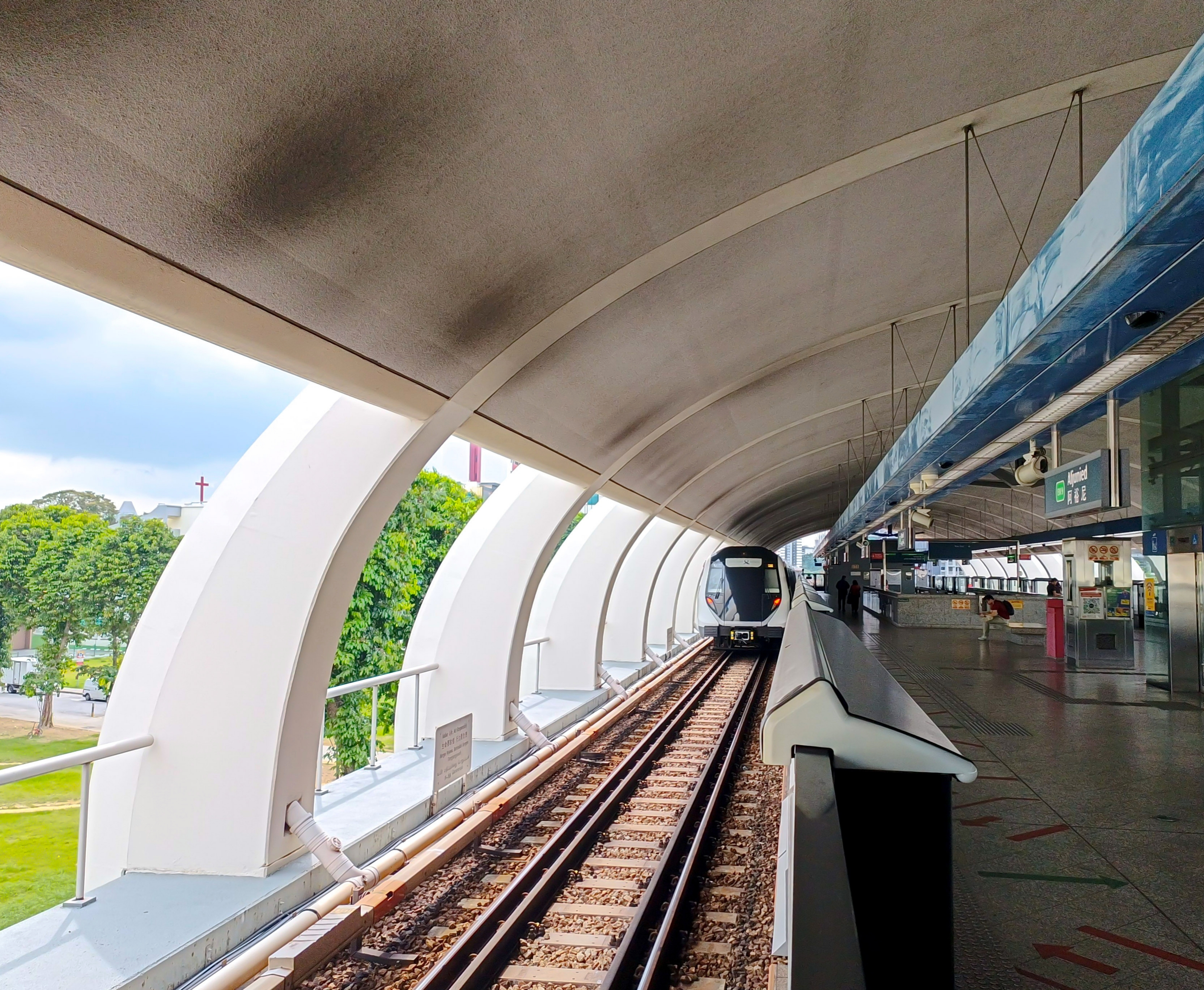
The inside of Aljunied Station's domed roof

Operated by SMRT Trains, it is between Paya Lebar and Kallang stations on the East–West line (EWL) with the station code EW9. When it opened, it had an iniitial station code of E4 before being changed to its current station code in August 2001 as a part of a system-wide campaign to cater to the expanding MRT system. Aljunied is an elevated station and, like many stations on the initial MRT network, has an island platform configuration. It is mostly wheelchair-accessible and has bicycle facilities.

The station is bounded by Aljunied Road and Geylang East Avenue as well as Geylang East Central and Sims Avenue. It has two exits serving the Geylang Methodist Primary and Secondary School, Geylang East Library, and Victoria Centre. Like many EWL stations on the eastern stretch, Aljunied station has a dome-shaped roof; it has been described by The Straits Times as "a caterpillar" in one article and "a rib cage" in another article. The roof was intended by the MRT Corporation to give the stations on the EWL an "attractive look".
