= Aljunied =

- Subzone of Geylang Planning Area

Name transcription(s)
  - Chinese: 阿裕尼; Āyùní (Pinyin); A-jū-nî (Hokkien POJ)
  - Malay: Aljunied (Rumi) الجنيد (Jawi)
  - Tamil: அல்ஜூனிட் Aljūṉiṭ (Transliteration)
- Location of Aljunied within Singapore
- Coordinates: 1°18′59.19″N 103°52′58.73″E
- Country: Singapore
- Planning Area: Geylang Planning Area

Area
  - Total: 2.96 km^{2} (1.14 sq mi)

Population (2026)
  - Total: 45,360
  - Density: 15,300/km^{2} (39,700/sq mi)

Aljunied (/ælˈdʒuːnɪd/ al-JOO-nid) is a suburban area located in the central part of the city-state of Singapore. Named after Aljunied Road, it was formerly agricultural land which has since been heavily urbanised and presently comprises a variety of land uses. Today, Aljunied is a bustling neighbourhood with HDB flats with amenities like shops, schools, parks and recreational facilities, as well as several traditional Singaporean shophouses.

== Etymology ==
Syed Sharif Omar bin Ali Al Junied owned large tracts of agricultural land in the area. In Palembang, he established a business after migrating from his hometown in Tarim, Yemen. Syed Omar came from the well-respected Arab family who were descendants of the Islamic prophet Muhammad.

Masjid Kampong Melaka was renamed Masjid Omar Kampong Melaka in his honour. In 1823, at the behest of Stamford Raffles, Syed Omar donated the land on which St Andrew's Cathedral now stands. He and his family also donated land for the establishment of Tan Tock Seng Hospital. Syed Omar's descendants continue to reside in Singapore.

Madrasah Aljunied is a leading Islamic religious school that produced many religious leaders of Southeast Asian countries.

== Education ==
=== Kindergarten ===
- St Magdalene's Kindergarten

=== Primary schools ===
- Canossa Catholic Primary School
- CHIJ Our Lady of Good Counsel
- Geylang Methodist School (Primary)
- Kong Hwa School

=== Secondary schools ===
- Geylang Methodist School (Secondary)

=== Special schools ===
- Canossian School

=== Former schools ===
- MacPherson Secondary School

== Politics ==
Aljunied formerly falls under Aljunied Constituency from 1959 to 1988. In 1968, the MacPherson area of Aljunied was under MacPherson Constituency and in 1988, renamed as MacPherson Single Member Constituency (SMC). In 1988, both wards were merged into Aljunied Group Representation Constituency (GRC). Despite its name however, the present-day Aljunied GRC does not cover the areas of the Aljunied.

MacPherson area existed as an SMC in its lifetime except in 1991 to 1997, from 2011 to 2015, and from 2025 onwards, where it was absorbed into Marine Parade-Braddell Heights GRC (previously Marine Parade GRC before 2025).

== See also ==
- Aljunied MRT station
- Geylang East Library
- Buddhist Library (Singapore)
- Foo Hai Ch'an Monastery
