= Rukhsana Khan =

Pakistani Canadian children's writer and storyteller

- Born: 1962 (age 63–64); Lahore, Pakistan
- Occupations: Writer, storyteller
- Writing career
- Period: 1990s–present
- Genres: Children's literature, picture books
- Website: rukhsanakhan.com

Rukhsana Khan (Note: Urdu: رخسانہ خان) (born 1962) is a Canadian children's writer and storyteller, whose stories have enabled children of all cultures to connect with cultures of Eastern origins.

== Biography ==
Rukhsana Khan was born in Lahore, Pakistan, in 1962. She immigrated to Canada with her family when she was three years old and grew up in Dundas, Ontario. She graduated from Seneca College of Applied Arts and Technology and became a biological-chemical technician. She has four children including three daughters and a son, and lives with her husband in Toronto, Ontario.

Khan's writing career began by writing songs for Adam's World children's videos. Her stories have appeared in Message International and Kahani magazines. Her award-winning books for children include picture books, short story collections and novels. She is a member of the Society of Children's Book Writers and Illustrators, The Writer's Union of Canada, CANSCAIP and Storytelling Toronto. Khan is also a member of the International Storytelling Network.

Khan is a "well-known Canadian children’s author who focuses on telling tales of diversity." Her books have been translated into several languages, including Italian and Japanese. She presented a speech titled "Freedom of Speech Versus Cultural Sensitivity: Balancing the Right to Create Freely vs. the Need of People to be Respected", at the 2008 IBBY (International Board on Books for Young People) World Congress in Copenhagen, Denmark.

== Awards ==
- Big Red Lollipop won the 2011 Golden Kite Award for picture book text.
- Big Red Lollipop won the 2011 Charlotte Zolotow Award.
- Wanting Mor was recognized as a Notable Book for a Global Society by the International Reading Association in 2010.

== Books ==
=== Picture books ===
- Rabia's Eid (2024)
- The Clever Wife (2022)
- King for a Day (2014)
- Big Red Lollipop (2010)
- Silly Chicken (2005)
- Ruler of the Courtyard (2003)
- King of the Skies (2001)
- The Roses in My Carpets (1998)
- Bedtime Ba-a-a-lk (1998)

=== Novels ===
- Wanting Mor (2009)
- Dahling, If You Luv Me Would You Please, Please Smile (1999)

=== Short stories ===
- A New Life (2009)
- Many Windows co-authored with Elisa Carbone and Uma Krishnaswami (2008)
- Muslim Child (1999)
