= Buddhist Library (Singapore) =

Library in Singapore

Coordinates: 01°18′47.20″N 103°53′0.91″E

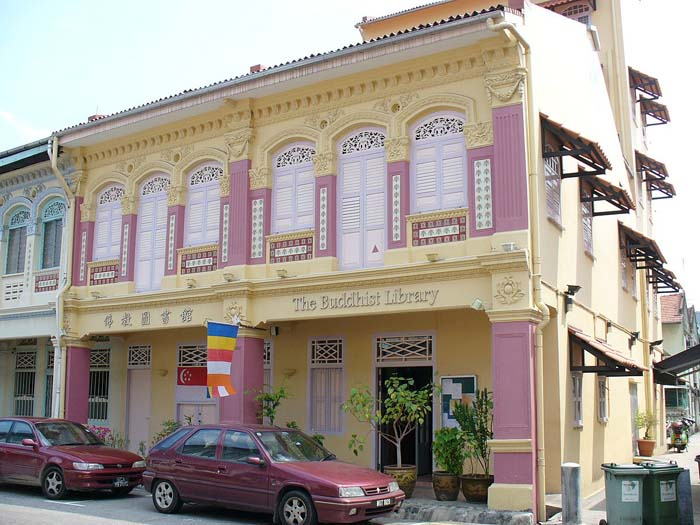
The Buddhist Library at 2 Lorong 24A Geylang, Singapore 398526

The Buddhist Library (Chinese: 佛教图书馆) is the first dedicated Buddhist library in Singapore. The library, which is located in a shophouse in Geylang, aims to meet the needs of the Buddhist community and anyone interested in Buddhism. It is unique in that it is not a voluntary association or a temple and because it takes a non-sectarian approach to Buddhism. Besides functioning as a lending library, it also organises Dhamma talks, accredited Buddhist courses, public art exhibitions and welfare work locally and abroad.

== History ==
In 1981, Venerable Dhammaratana, a Sri Lankan Theravadin monk, founded the Buddhist Research Society (BRS) in Singapore. One of the aims of the BRS was to set up a Buddhist library. The Library was started in 1982 in a rented unit of Tanjong Katong Complex. Its initial setup was backed financially by the late George Chia Soon Seng, who was a businessman and a devout Buddhist. The Library shifted to Katong Shopping Centre in 1984 and moved again to another rented unit in Hoa Nam Building in 1985. The Library finally bought its own premises at Lorong 29 Geylang in 1991 and it was officially opened on 15 March 1992. Due to the growing needs of its expanding membership and the Buddhist community, the Library relocated to nearby Lorong 24A Geylang in 1998, occupying 2 units of a row of pre-war shophouses that are located within the Geylang Conservation Area, where it stands today.

=== Founder ===
Venerable Dhammaratana, or more commonly addressed as Bhante by his devotees (Pali for "Venerable sir"; often used when addressing a Buddhist monk), is the founding and pivotal figure of The Buddhist Library. Bhante was born in Sri Lanka and received his Buddhist ordination at the age of 13. He is the senior pupil of the late Venerable Bellanwila Sri Somaratana Nayaka Thera and a graduate of Vidyalankara University. After graduation, Bhante served as the Deputy Principal and Principal at two prestigious Buddhist schools, Sunethradevi Pirivena and Paramadhamma Chetiya Pirivena respectively.

In 1973, he gave up a ready-made life of an abbot in the well-established Bellanwila Temple located near Colombo in Sri Lanka to propagate the Buddha's teachings in Singapore at the invitation of Venerable M. Mahavihara. In 1978, Bhante started his Buddhist education service in Singapore in a garage at 85A Marine Parade Road. He founded the Buddhist Research Society (BRS) in 1981 and The Buddhist Library in 1982. On his inspiration on starting a non-profit library, Bhante said:

To start a Buddhist library in Singapore is better than to start ten temples. Knowledge can be passed down from one generation to another. In the long run, education contributes towards fostering a caring and sharing society with less social ills... With a vision for the future, we started, on a modest scale, to build a library of Buddhist literature covering all three major schools of Buddhism – Theravada, Mahayana and Vajrayana. We made this the nucleus and around it we built various affiliated activities to promote the learning and practice of the noble teachings of the Buddha.

In 1999, Bhante founded a meditation retreat centre, the Paramita International Buddhist Centre, located at Kadugannawa, Sri Lanka with the assistance of Buddhist devotees from Singapore. In 2003, Bhante obtained his Master of Philosophy Degree from Kelaniya University, Sri Lanka. In December 2004, the Bhante was officially appointed the Chief Sangha Nayaka of Singapore by The Buddhist Sangha Council of Sri Lanka.

== Activities and management ==
The Library is managed by a 14-member Management Committee that comprises lay Buddhist scholars and senior volunteers of the Buddhist Research Society with Bhante as their Religious Advisor. Bhante's vision is that one day The Buddhist Library would earn international recognition as a Buddhist centre of excellence. Its facilities and programmes are:

=== The library ===
The Library houses over 16,000 books in English and Chinese covering various aspects of Buddhism, including scriptural texts, doctrine, philosophy, ethics, meditation, devotion, art and architecture. The Library has a sizeable collection of books on related subjects, including other major world religions, Eastern and Western philosophy, comparative religion, psychology and ecology. The Library's book collection keeps growing through the generous donation of members and devotees.

The Buddhist Library first started conducting courses in the basic doctrines of Buddhism and then graduated to providing more advanced courses (up to Masters level awarded by Sri Lankan Buddhist authorities), both of which have helped to extend the horizon of Dhamma knowledge of those who are interested in learning Buddhism. The Buddhist Library has periodically been receiving distinguished Buddhist monks and scholars from various countries to deliver lectures and participate in seminars. Its resources are widely referenced by researchers and notable universities such as Duke University Libraries as part of their undergraduate level teaching and research on Southeast Asian studies.

The Shrine Hall, with a seating capacity for 100, is where devotional services or Pujas are held regularly and on Buddhist festivals led by Bhante. Despite his advanced age, he also performs blessing services, such as housewarming ceremonies, wedding services, birthday blessings, hospital visits and wake services as requested by members of the Library and their families. The hall also doubles up as an auditorium where Dhamma talks and seminars are held.

The Art Gallery displays a collection of contemporary Buddhist paintings, Tibetan thangkas and sculptures to promote awareness and appreciation of Buddhist Art. One of the main highlights at the gallery is the facsimile of the Buddha's footprint, an intricate work of art from Sri Lanka. The gallery is also used for Puja during festivals, meditation sessions and Sutta chanting practices. The Meditation Room is at the attic level of The Buddhist Library. Buddhist meditation or Bhavana in Pali, is a core mental development practice that is embedded in the Buddha's teaching and has Enlightenment as its ultimate aim. The room is also used for its Sunday Dhamma classes for children and youth.

=== Welfare work ===
Despite its modest resources, the volunteers and supporters of The Buddhist Library regularly organise charitable activities for the needy regardless of their race or religion. Examples include annual charity funfairs, visits to local old folks' homes, efforts to assist victims of the 2004 Indian Ocean earthquake and donation of used spectacles to old folks' homes in Sri Lanka in 2004.

== See also ==
- Theravada Buddhism
- Mahayana Buddhism
- Vajrayana Buddhism
