= Scholastic Asian Book Award =

The Scholastic Asian Book Award (SABA) is the joint initiative of Scholastic Asia and the Singapore Book Council (SBC). The award recognizes children's writers of Asian origin who are taking the experiences of life, spirit, and thinking in different parts of Asia to the world at large. The award also aims to promote the understanding of the Asian experience and its expression in innovative and creative forms. The awards are announced at the Asian Festival of Children's Content in Singapore.

== Objectives ==
- To recognise excellence in fiction in Asian stories for children
- To showcase the diversity of literary talent within Asia
- To encourage and inspire more books and stories with Asian content

== Winners ==
=== 2011 ===
- Winner: Book Uncle and Me, by Uma Krishnaswarmi (India)
- 2nd: The Girl Mechanic of Wanzhou, by Marjorie Sayer (USA)
- 3rd: The Mudskipper, by Ovidia Yu (Singapore)

=== 2012 ===
- Winner: Bungee Cord Hair, by Ching Yeung Russell (USA)
- 2nd: Not in the Stars, by Pauline Loh Tuan Lee (Singapore)
- 3rd: Hidden in Plain Sight, by Ang Su-Lin (Singapore)

=== 2014 ===
Sources:

- Winner: What Things Mean, by Sophia N. Lee (Philippines)
- 2nd: Sula’s Voyage, by Catherine Torres (Philippines)
- 3rd: Robin and the Case of the Summer Camp Kidnapping, by Vivek Bhanot (India)

=== 2016 ===
Sources:

- Winner: Codex: The Lost Treasure of the Indus, by Aditi Krishnakumar (India)
- 2nd: Chasing Freedom, by Tina Cho (South Korea)
- 3rd: Island Girl, by Ho Lee Ling (Singapore)

=== 2018 ===
- Winner: Wing of the Locust, by Joel Donato Jacob (Philippines)
- 2nd: Red Eyes, by Varsha Seshan (India)
- 3rd: Blue2, by Yuet Lan Dora Tsang (Hong Kong)

== See also ==
- Scholastic Picture Book Award
