= MacPherson, Singapore =

MacPherson
- Neighbourhood

Name transcription(s)
  - Chinese: 麦波申
  - Pinyin: Màibōshēn
  - Malay: MacPherson
  - Tamil: மக்பெர்சொன்
- Public housing residences at MacPherson
- Interactive map of MacPherson
- Coordinates: 1.32665°N 103.890019°E
- Country: Singapore
- Planning area: Geylang
- Subzone: MacPherson

Population (2024)
  - Total: 26,850

MacPherson is a neighbourhood located within the district of Geylang in the Central Region of Singapore. Its location roughly corresponds to the identically titled subzone in the Geylang Planning Area and is approximately sandwiched between the neighbourhoods of Aljunied and Paya Lebar. MacPherson largely consists of various public housing estates centred on Circuit Road and an industrial area. The Pelton Canal runs through the neighbourhood, which separates a private housing estate off MacPherson Road, and the public housing estate along Circuit Road.

Many residents in MacPherson are from the older generation, as the area was one of the first major public housing projects developed between the 1950s to 1970s. As a result, the majority of facilities in MacPherson are designed to be wheelchair and elderly-friendly. Nevertheless, in recent years, multiple built-to-order (BTO) public housing developments have been constructed, such as MacPherson Spring and MacPherson Weave, which are geared towards newly established young families.

The neighbourhood is served by MacPherson Community Club, operated by the People's Association (PA) with Residents' Committee (RCs) and Neighbourhood Committees (NCs) scattered around the entire neighbourhood. These organisations facilitate various programmes to promote community involvement and interaction among residents.

== Etymology ==
The area is also alternatively called Jalan Klapa, as the area historically ran through a coconut plantation. MacPherson Road was named after Colonel Ronald MacPherson (1817–1869). MacPherson was involved in the First Opium War of 1841 and was appointed Staff Officer to the Artillery in the Straits Settlements in 1843. He succeeded Colonel H. Man as Executive Engineer and Superintendent of Convicts and Resident Councillor, Malacca in 1855 and 1857 respectively.

The name Macpherson itself – or MacPherson or McPherson, according to different spellings – is believed to have come from the Gaelic Mac a' phearsain and means 'Son of the parson'. For some old folks it was called Persiaran Keliling.

== Religion ==
The neighbourhood is served by religious sites such as churches, temples and mosques. They include Saint Stephen's Catholic Church, Trinity Christian Centre, Grace Baptist Church, Sallim Mattar Mosque and Huang Lao Xian Shi Temple. These religious organisations often have charity extensions and are actively serving the needy in the MacPherson neighbourhood.

== Parks and greenspace ==
Parks and recreational facilities are distributed around the neighbourhood, with the main park being the Pelton Park Connector, which stretches the entire distance from Balam Road to Paya Lebar Way. There are also larger parks such as the Aljunied Park located near the neighbourhood.

== Education ==
The Ministry of Education has a total of 4 mainstream Primary and Secondary Schools in MacPherson, Singapore. They are Geylang Methodist School (Primary), Geylang Methodist School (Secondary), Canossa Catholic Primary School, and St. Margaret's Primary School, which is temporarily relocated here for improvements work to be conducted on their old campus. There is also a school for special needs students, called Canossian School.

== Infrastructure ==
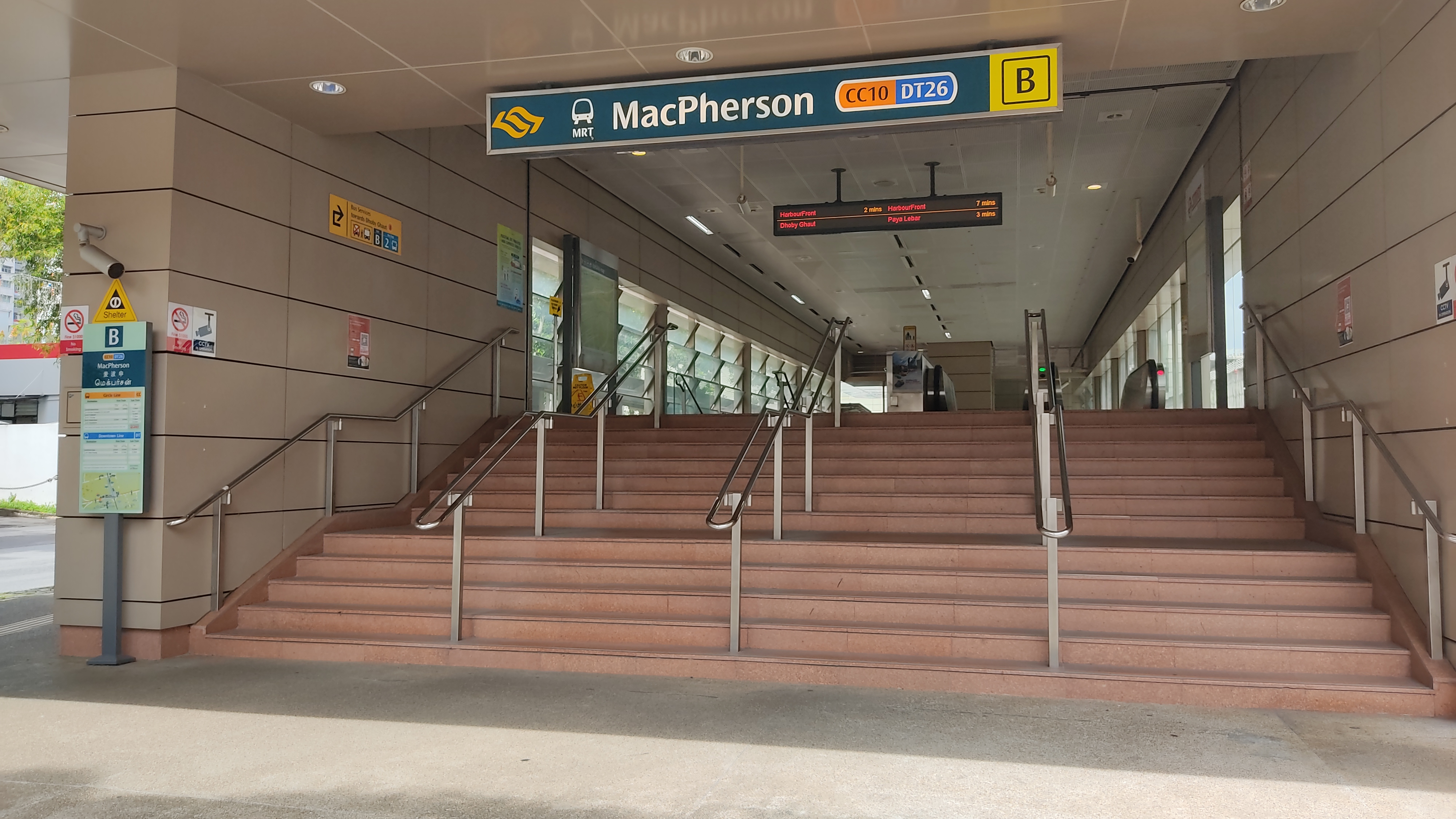
MacPherson MRT station

=== Transportation ===
The neighbourhood is served by MacPherson MRT station on the Circle Line and Downtown Line, and Mattar MRT station on the Downtown Line.

=== Other amenities ===
MacPherson is served by the nearby Geylang Polyclinic at Aljunied, operated by the National Healthcare Group. There are also many private general practitioners around the neighbourhood, usually located below the public housing flats.

Nearby shopping malls include Grantral Mall @ MacPherson, MacPherson Mall, Paya Lebar Square, and Paya Lebar Quarter. The majority of the shopping options in MacPherson are located in the markets or along the HDB shophouses.

== Politics ==
During the 1959 Singaporean general election, MacPherson was part of Aljunied Constituency. It was represented by S. V. Lingam of the governing People's Action Party (PAP) from 1959 to 1968. In 1968, MacPherson was split out from Aljunied Constituency to form MacPherson Constituency. The constituency has been part of Marine Parade Group Representation Constituency (GRC) between 1991 and 1997, and 2011 and 2015, and since 2025, the Marine Parade–Braddell Heights GRC, which was renamed from the former GRC as well.

MacPherson has always been represented by the ruling People's Action Party in their lifetime, making it one of their safe seats for the party. Cabinet minister Chua Sian Chin first represented MacPherson after its formation. Chua has since been succeeded by two other MPs, former South East CDC mayor Matthias Yao from 1991 to 2011, and Tin Pei Ling since 2011.

== Hawker food culture ==
A distinctive identity of MacPherson from the rest of Singapore are its hawker food culture. The neighbourhood's hawker centres are often featured and patronised by local media as well as food bloggers, including international ones. In particular, five distinctive and large hawker centres located in MacPherson encompasses the entire neighbourhood.

To cater to the diversity of races and religions in MacPherson, and Singapore in general, they serve unique dishes stemming from Singaporean cuisine which had been created by the local Chinese, Malay, Indian and Eurasian communities. Most notably, the hawker centres that have been intensively featured by the news and on social media are 79 and 79A Circuit Road Hawker Centre, as well as the two-storey complex located at 80 Circuit Road Food Centre.

Although hawker centres are widespread throughout the country, the allure towards MacPherson are due to the fact that the majority of the hawker stall owners are older and would prepare their food in the traditional styles, and due to the demographics of MacPherson, the cost of food is also lower for more widespread affordability. However, there is also a trend of newer hawkers, typically of a younger age, starting out their first hawker stall which sells regional Asian cuisines, such as Japanese, Korean, and Thai cuisine.
