= Uma Krishnaswami =

American writer

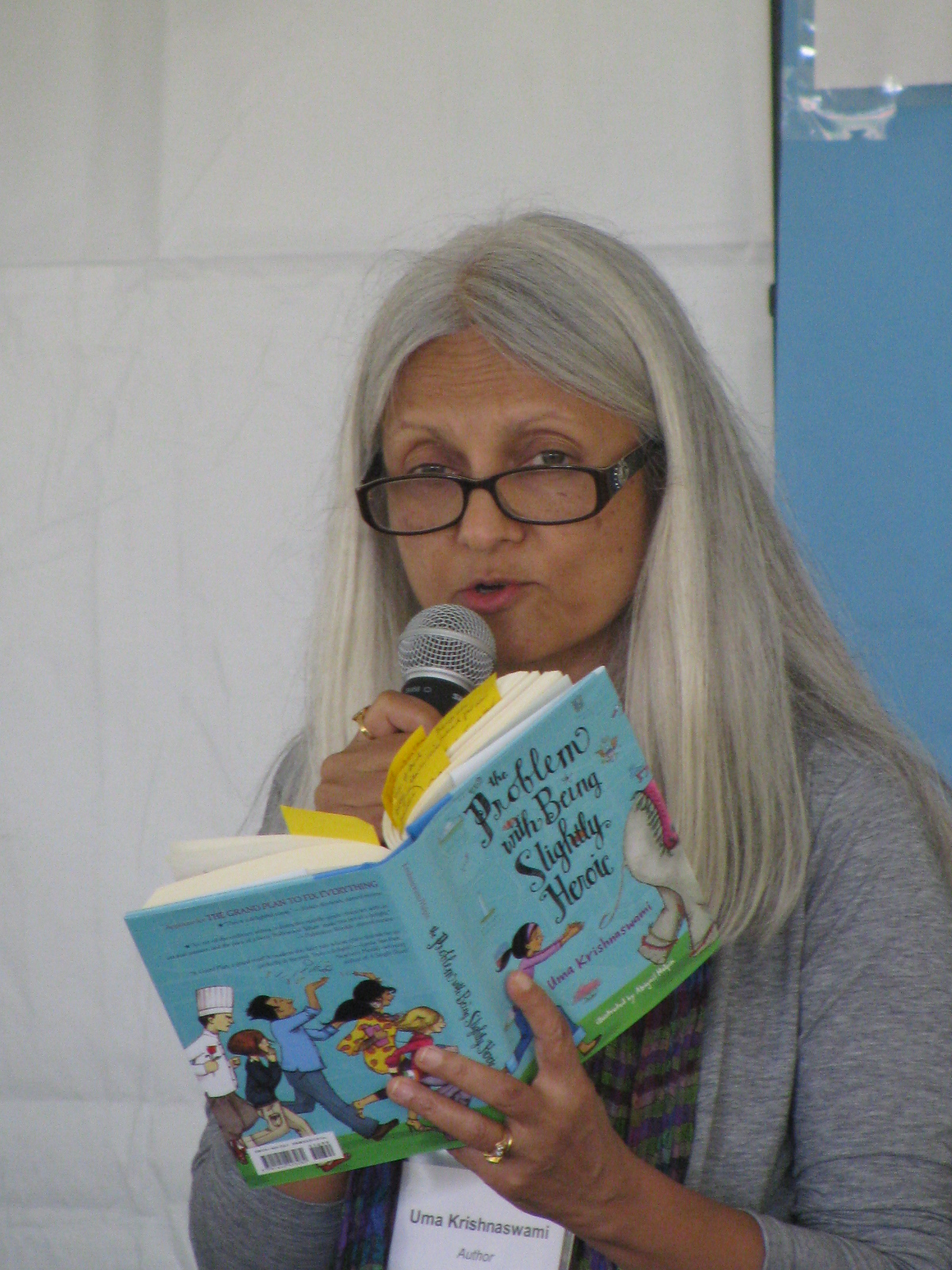
- Reading at the 2014 Gaithersburg Book Festival
- Born: 1956 (age 69–70)
- Occupations: Writer, writing teacher
- Writing career
- Period: 1990s–present
- Genres: Children's literature, picture books, non-fiction
- Website: umakrishnaswami.com

Uma Krishnaswami is an Indian author of picture books and novels for children and is a writing teacher. She is "recognized as a major voice in the expanding of international and multicultural young adult fiction and children's literature."

== Biography ==
Krishnaswami was born in 1956 in New Delhi, India. She received a degree in political science, and a master's degree in social work from the University of Delhi. In 1979, she moved to the United States where she received an additional graduate degree from the University of Maryland, College Park. She then moved to Aztec, New Mexico where she lived for many years. She now lives in Victoria, British Columbia, Canada, and she is a dual citizen of the United States and Canada and an Overseas Citizen of India.

Her first published story appeared in Children's World, a magazine published in India, when she was thirteen. Her stories and poems have been published in Cricket, Highlights and Cicada. Her award-winning books, which include middle grade novels, picture books, early readers, and non-fiction are published in English, Hindi, Tamil and twelve other languages.

In 2011 Krishnaswami appeared at the National Book Festival which is organized by the Library of Congress.

Chachaji's Cup, one of Krishnaswami's picture books, was adapted into a musical and performed in several theaters in both New York City and California.

Krishnaswami has taught writing to adults and children for years, and for over ten years she was the writer in residence at the Aztec Ruins National Monument. She is a member of the Society of Children's Book Writers and Illustrators and CANSCAIP. She also taught writing classes online through Writers on the Net. She currently teaches in the MFA in Writing for Children and Young Adults program at Vermont College of Fine Arts.

== Awards ==
- 1997 Scientific American Young Readers Award for The Broken Tusk: Stories of the Hindu God Ganesha
- 2005 Notable Book For a Global Society (International Literacy Association) for Naming Maya
- 2013 Crossword Book Award (Children's Literature) for Book Uncle and Me
- 2011 Scholastic Asian Book Award for Book Uncle and Me
- 2017-2018 Asian/Pacific American Award for Literature for Step Up to the Plate, Maria Singh
- 2017 USBBY Outstanding International Books List for Book Uncle and Me
- 2022 Bank Street Children's Book Committee's Best Books of the Year List for Threads of Peace: How Mohandas Gandhi and Martin Luther King Jr. Changed the World
- 2022 Bank Street Children's Book Committee's Best Books of the Year List for Two at the Top: A Shared Dream of Everest

== Bibliography ==
=== Middle Grade and Chapter Books ===
- Threads of Peace: How Mohandas Gandhi and Martin Luther King Jr. Changed the World (2021)
- Step Up to the Plate, Maria Singh (2017)
- Book Uncle and Me (2012, 2016)
- The Problem with Being Slightly Heroic (2013)
- The Grand Plan to Fix Everything (2011)
- Naming Maya (2004)

=== Picture books ===
- Two at the Top: A Shared Dream of Everest (2021)
- Bright Sky, Starry City (2015)
- The Girl of the Wish Garden: A Thumbelina Story (2013)
- Out of the Way! Out of the Way! (2010)
- Remembering Grandpa (2007)
- Bringing Asha Home (2006)
- The Closet Ghosts (2006)
- The Happiest Tree (2005)
- Monsoon (2003)
- Chachaji's Cup (2003)

=== Early readers ===
- Holi (2003)
- Hello Flower (2002)
- Yoga Class (2001)

=== Retold story collections ===
- The Broken Tusk: Stories of the Hindu God Ganesha (2006, 1996)
- Shower of Gold: Girls and Women in the Stories of India (1999)
- Stories of the Flood (1994)

=== Short fiction ===
- "Chandra," in The Poetry of US published by National Geographic Kids (2018)
- "The Gift," in Period Pieces (2003)
- "Going to Kashi," in Soul Searching (2002)

=== Nonfiction ===
- Beyond the Field Trip : Teaching and Learning in Public Places (2002)
- No Joke! Humor and Culture in Middle-Grade Books in The Horn Book Magazine Family Reading (May/June 2012 issue)
- Why Stop at Windows and Mirrors? Diverse Books Act as Prisms for Readers in The Horn Book Magazine (Jan/Feb 2019 issue)

=== Co-authored ===
- Many Windows : Six Kids, Five Faiths, One Community. Written with Rukhsana Khan and Elisa Lynn Carbone (2008)

== See also ==
- List of Indian writers
