= Queen's Theatre, Singapore =

Historical building in Singapore

Queen’s Theatre
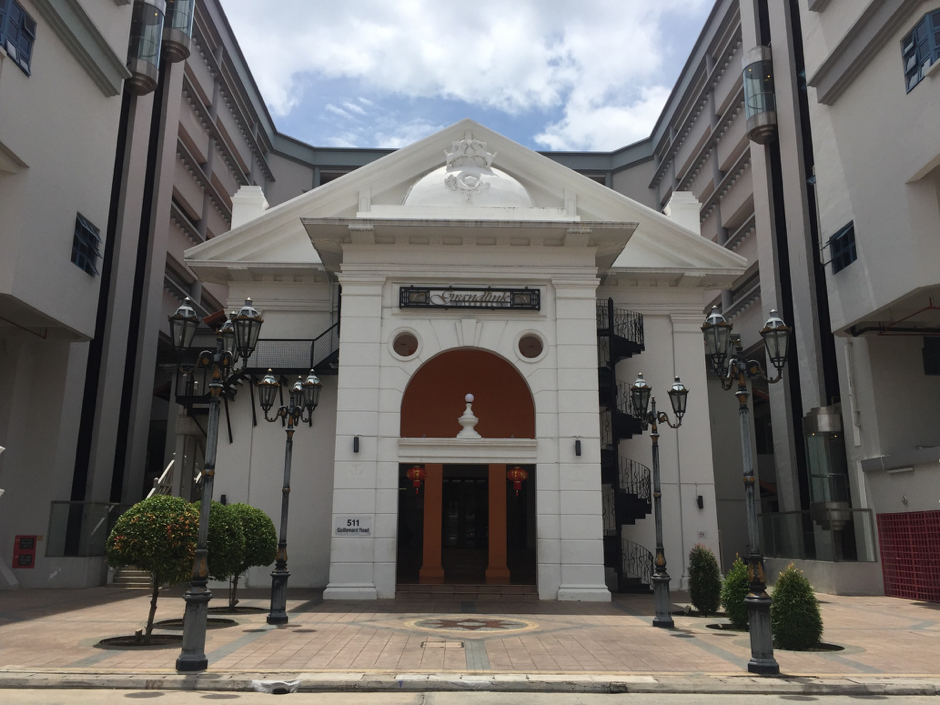
- Facade of the Former Queen's Theatre

- Location in Singapore
- Full name: Former Queen’s Theatre
- Former names: Wembley Cinema; Ritz Cinema
- Address: 511 Guillemard Road, Singapore 399849
- Location: Singapore
- Coordinates: 1°18′51.8″N 103°53′29.1″E
- Type: theater

Construction
- Built: 1929; 97 years ago
- Opened: 1930; 96 years ago
- Renovated: 1939; 87 years ago 2000; 26 years ago
- Closed: 1982; 44 years ago

The Queen's Theatre was a former cinema located at Geylang Road in Singapore. The theatre had been one of the main entertainment places in Geylang from 1930 to 1982. The building was founded as Wembley Cinema in 1930 before being renamed as Ritz Cinema in 1933. It was finally renamed as the Queen's Theatre in 1939. The front façade of the building is now conserved and becomes part of the Grandlink Square.

== History ==
In 1930, Wembley Cinema was opened as a suburban theatre in Geylang. The announcement of the opening was published on The Malaya Tribune, a local press. The cinema was equipped with Western Electric apparatus to offer patrons good sound reproduction and synchronization. There would be two changes of program weekly, and two shows nightly at 6.15 pm and 9.15 pm. A matinee would be shown on Sunday at 3 pm when children were admitted at half price.

Many popular films were shown there, like the American musical operetta film The Vagabond King and British crime film Deadlock. The films shown in Wembley Cinema ranged from international and local films. The cinema was so popular in 1930 and 1931 that it had developed into a main place of entertainment in Geylang.

In 1933, Ritz Cinema, which was also located at Geylang, moved into Wembley hall. The consolidation of the two suburban cinemas in Geylang brought more people to the building, whose name was officially changed to Ritz Cinema.

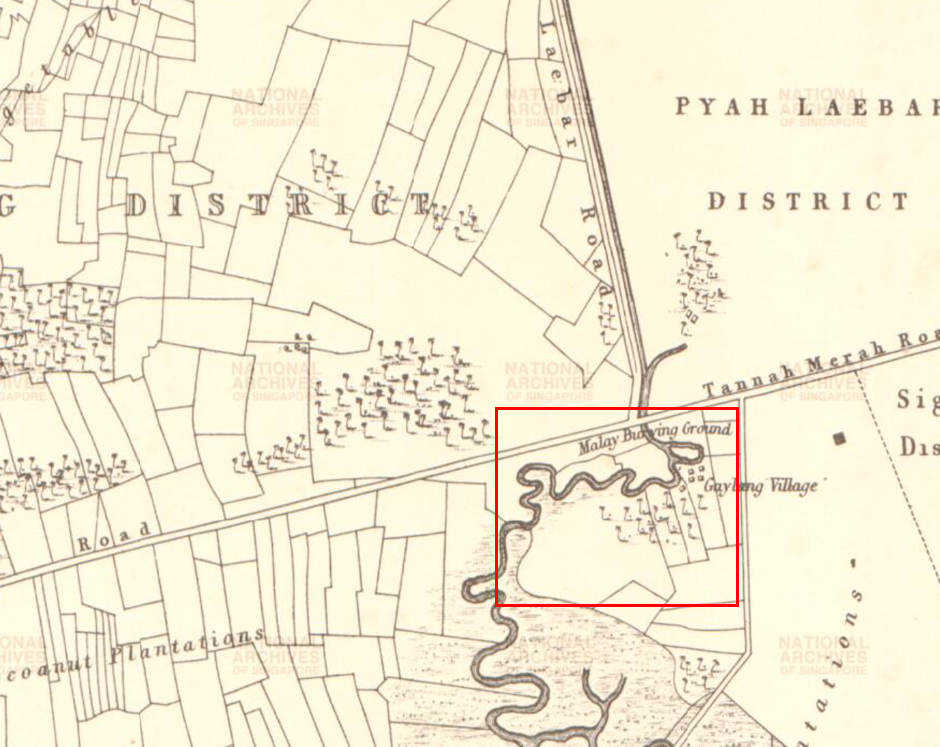
old map of the location of the Queen's Theater

1933-1938: Films like “Saramang”, an American pre-Code action film, and Charlie Chaplin’s epic comedy film “Modern Times” were well received. An Egyptian talkie entitled “Long Live Love” was re-screened due to the fact that Abdul Wahab, whose singing and acting have delighted local Muslim cinema-fans was featured in the principal role. The price was sometimes halved to attract more people.

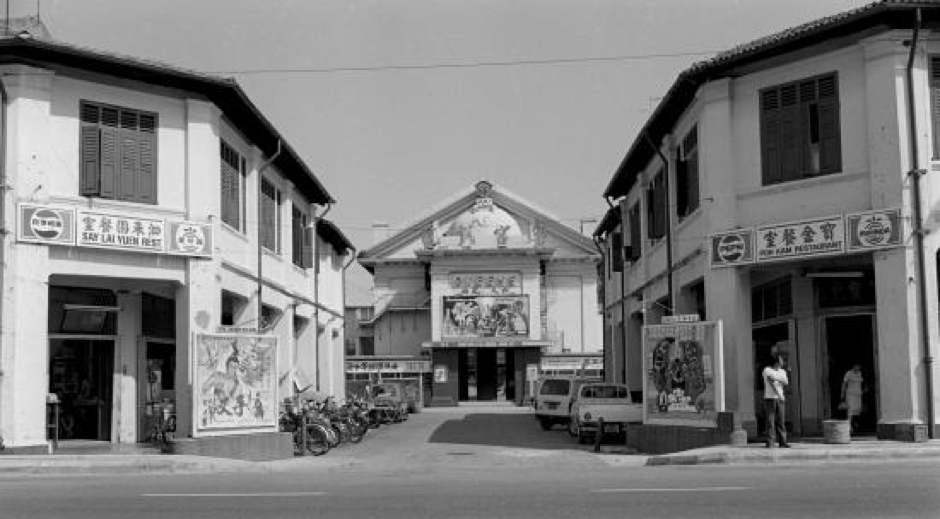
Queen's Theatre before it was closed

In 1939 Malaya Tribunes announced that the Ritz Cinema was closed due to reconstruction, and the name was changed to Queen's Theatre. New car park was added for the Queen's Theatre after the renovation.

1939-1941: Queen's Theatre continued providing good quality films, like the Malay Film “Harta Berdarah”, to residents in Geylang

1941-1945: During World War II, the movies were banned. The Queen's Theatre was converted to stage Bangsawan shows with a generous dose of singing. Bangsawan is a type of traditional Malay opera performed by a troupe. Stories were given by the Japanese or passed by the Japanese military police before actual stage. If the Japanese were pleased with the performance, the troupes would receive more rice rations. Anti-British stories were warmly received.

1946-1948: After World War II, the Queen's Theatre was back to movie industry with films like “Isle of Forgotten Shas”.

1949: The Shaw Organization showed interest in acquiring the theatre and indeed turned it into its property.

1951-1952: The Queen's Theatre was under repair work since 1951, but after two men met their deaths in falls, all work has been suspended. After the death of Chung Seng Kar who slipped and rolled off the sloping roof on to the concrete below on 1951.12.25, the rumors of a spiteful ghost haunting the building roof spread widely. The fact that the theatre was built on the site of an old Malay cemetery and the skeletons were unearthed when the foundations were laid was lending weight to the rumors. Moreover, the police investigators gave evidence that two or three years ago an Arab employee at the theatre had died as a result of a fall through the ceiling. Although it was proved that the accident was because of rain, the rumor affected the repair work of the Queen's Theatre.

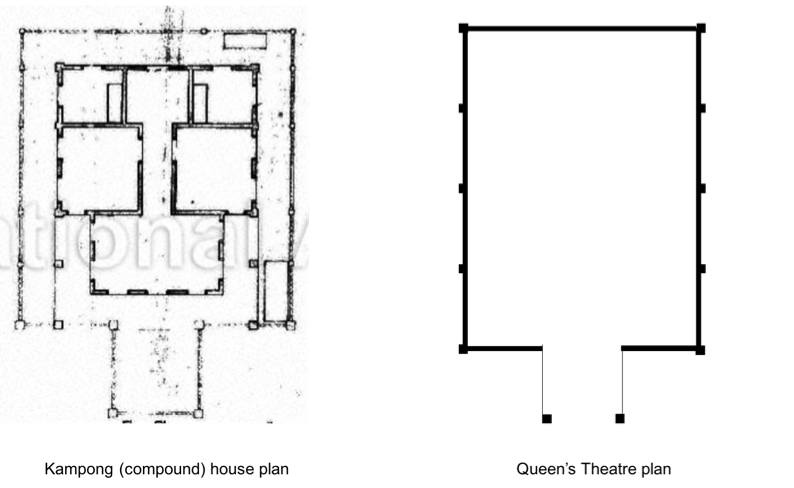
Plans of the traditional kampung house and the Former Queen's Theatre

In earlier 1980s, the movie business kept going down due to the stiff competition from TV and videotapes. The cinema attendance had been dropping steadily from a peak of 46,054,000 in 1979 to a low of 35,781,000 last year. Many closed cinemas like Hoover, was turned into a theatre for “live” entertainment and musical variety shows.

In 1982, the theatre was closed. After the theatre closed, a church planned to convert the theatre as their venue.

In 2000, a condominium, Grandlink Square, was built on the site of the Queen's Theatre. The front facade of the theatre was kept and become part of the facades of the GrandLink Square. The façade now is under the conservation area of Urban Redevelopment Authority.

== Architecture ==
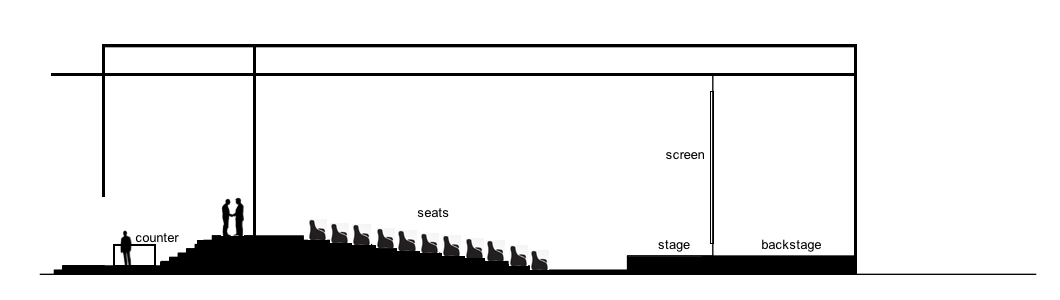
based on the plan of the building and description of the interior, this section is deduced as a possible reference

The theatre had characters of colonial-style architecture which was popular when Singapore was under British colonial rule. The European architectural style, such as Palladian, Renaissance or Neoclassical style, was usually applied to civic and commercial building by the colonial government. The equilateral triangle at the top of the façade with decorations on the edges and the dome at the entrance structure clearly indicates the colonial fashion in Singapore architecture in 1930s. Moreover, the columns with decoration and lamp at the top by two sides defines the front yard of the theatre.

However, when looking at plan of this building, it is a typical Kampong (compound) house which the entrance, or front of the building, is marked by an extruding structure. The building is raised from ground level, in the consideration of possible flood or heavy rain in tropical climate. Deducing from the dimension of the theatre, the building contains one cinema hall with sufficient space for comfortable seats. Linear arrangement of the space gives people comfortable experience in the cinema. The localization of the colonial style in Singapore followed the fashion, and responded to local climate and culture. No doubt that the theatre had been attractive not only because of the programs and facilities, architecture also helps it to gain much popularity.
