= Scholastic Picture Book Award =

Picture book award

The Scholastic Picture Book Award (SPBA) is an award developed by Scholastic Asia and the Singapore Book Council.

== Winners ==
=== 2015 ===
- Grand Prize: The First Journey, by Phung Nguyen Quang (writer) and Huynh Kim Lien (illustrator) (Vietnam)
- 2nd: Pandu, the Ogoh-Ogoh Maker, by Ari Nilandari (writer) and Dewi Tri K. (illustrator) (Indonesia)
- 3rd: Purchased Dream, by Ganbaatar Ichinnorov (writer) and Bolormaa Baasansuren (illustrator) (Mongolia)

== See also ==
- Scholastic Asian Book Award
