= National Library Board =

Statutory board overseeing libraries in Singapore (est. 1995)

Agency overview
- Formed: 1 September 1995; 31 years ago
- Preceding agency: National Library
- Jurisdiction: Singapore
- Headquarters: 100 Victoria Street, #14-01, National Library Building, Singapore 188064
- Annual budget: S$332.06 million (2025)
- Agency executives: Lee Seow Hiang, Chairman; Melissa-May Tam, Chief Executive
- Parent agency: Ministry of Digital Development and Information
- Website: www.nlb.gov.sg
- Agency ID: T08GB0037J

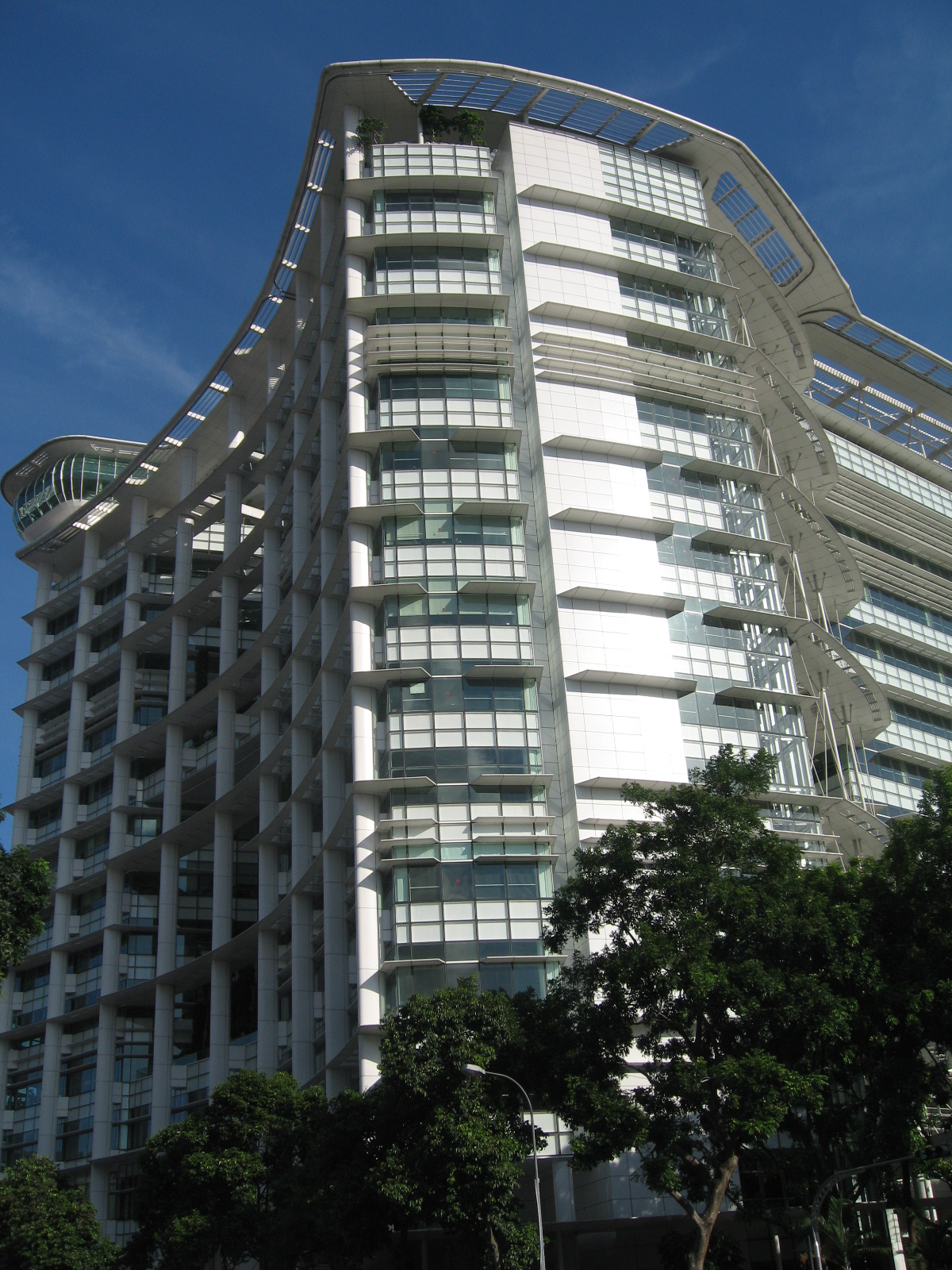
National Library Building is the headquarters of the National Library Board.

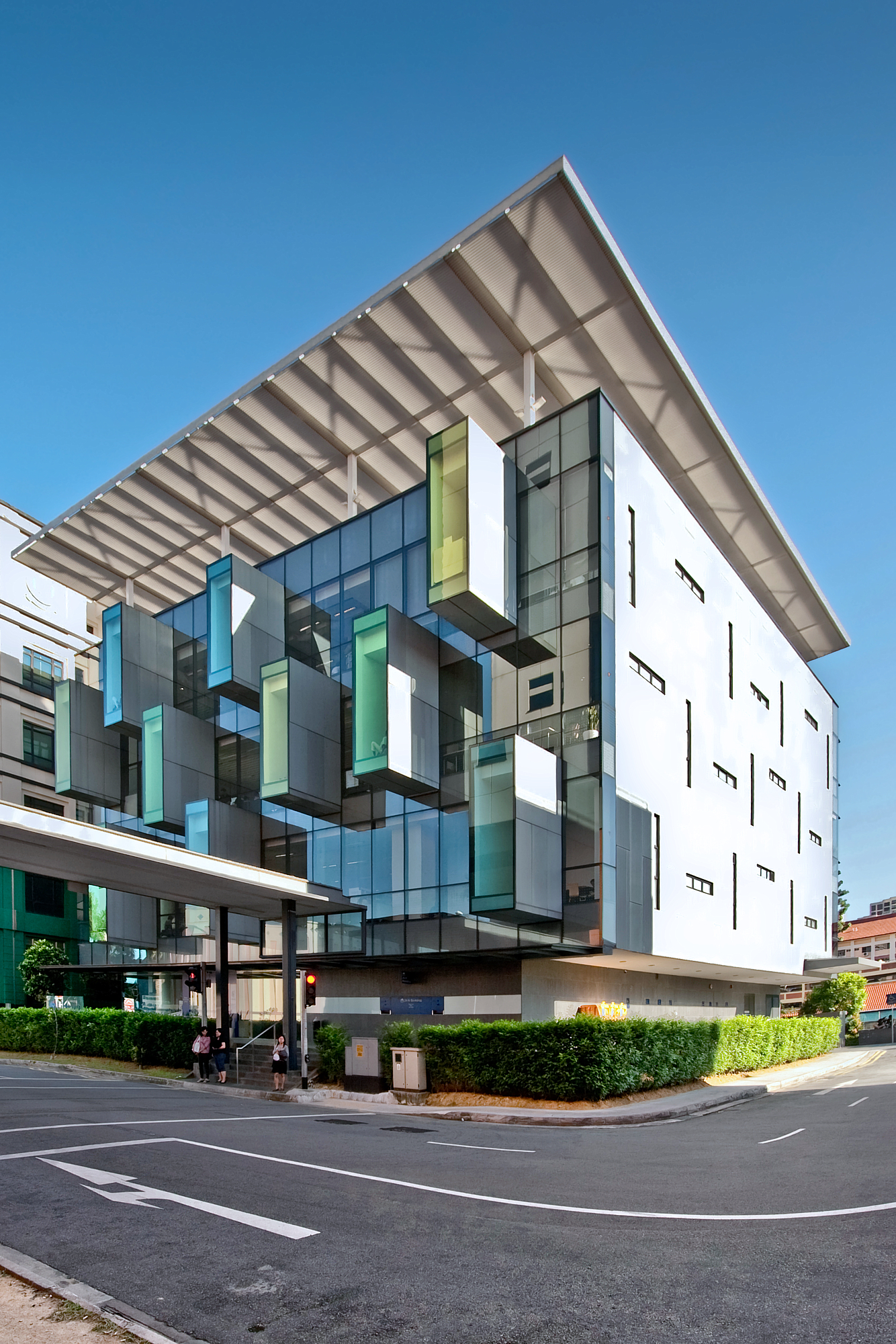
Bishan Public Library

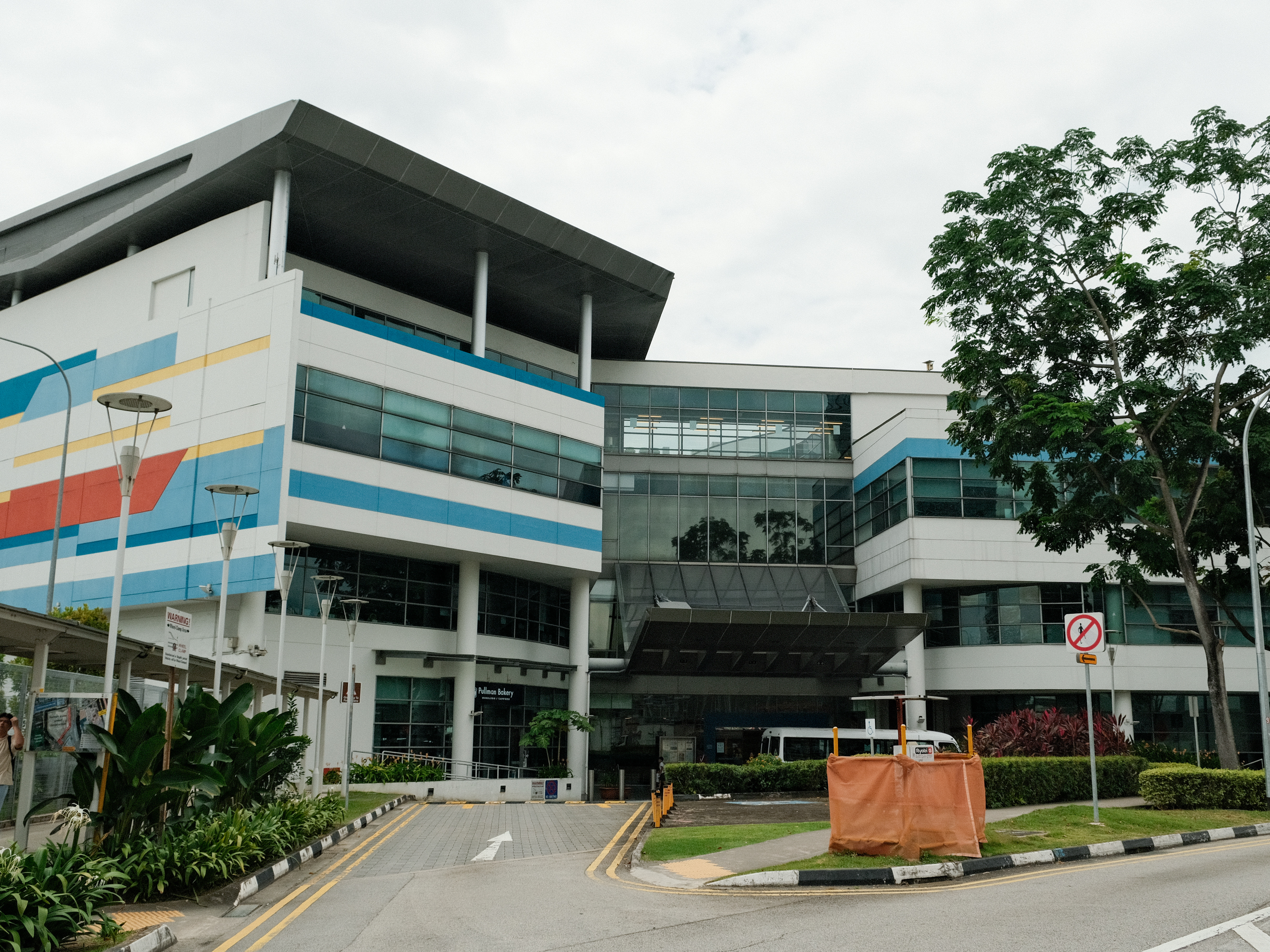
Jurong Regional Library

The National Library Board (NLB) is a statutory board under the purview of the Ministry of Digital Development and Information of the government of Singapore. The board manages the public libraries throughout the country.

The national libraries of Singapore house books in all four official languages of Singapore: English, Chinese, Malay and Tamil. Other than paper books, the libraries also loans CD-ROMs, DVD-ROMs, VCDs, video cassettes, audiobooks on CDs, magazines and periodicals, DVD-videos, Blu-rays and music CDs. Its flagship institution, the National Library, Singapore, is based on Victoria Street.

== History ==
Although the NLB was first formed on 1 September 1995, its history had begun way back in the 1820s when Stamford Raffles first proposed the idea of establishing a public library. This library was to evolve into the National Library of Singapore in 1960, before expanding into the suburbs with the setting up of branch libraries in the various new towns throughout the country.

=== Library 2000 ===
In 1995, when the NLB took over the duties of the National Library of Singapore, it was also entrusted with bringing to reality the findings of the Library 2000 Review Committee, set up in June 1992 to review the public library system. This committee, headed by Tan Chin Nam, considered the role of information technology in contemporary library services for the next decade, with the aims of

1. Establishing Singapore as an international information hub;
2. Preserving and promoting Singapore's literary heritage;
3. Providing for education, knowledge and research;
4. And promoting a well-read and well-informed society.

The committee also took into consideration the library needs of public library users in general, the linguistic needs of an increasingly bilingual populace, the catering to the needs of professions who require extensive information databases, and the establishment of the library as a nucleus of national culture and heritage. After a year-long review, the Committee published their findings on 5 March 1994, which calls for six "strategic thrusts", which are

1. An Adaptive Public Library System
2. A Network of Borderless Libraries
3. A Coordinated National Collection Strategy
4. Quality Service Through Market Orientation
5. Symbiotic Linkages With Business And Community
6. A Global Knowledge Arbitrage

In addition, the report also speaks of three "key enablers" to bring about these changes, which are

1. the setting up of a new statutory board
2. staff development, and the
3. exploiting of new technology.

The NLB was thus formed as a result of this Report. The NLB implements initiatives arising from the Report's recommendations.

The National Library Board has changed their logo to celebrate their 30 anniversary.

In 2013, the NLB also promoted a new framework to combat the rise of phishing scams, called the S.U.R.E campaign. S.U.R.E stands for: Source, Understand, Research and Evaluate.

The campaign also included S.U.R.E for work, schools and life to cater for different needs for everybody.

== Controversy ==
In July 2014, the NLB announced that it was pulping three children's books, And Tango Makes Three, The White Swan Express, and Who's in My Family?, following a user's complaint that the books' homosexual themes did not promote family values. In protest, several poets and writers resigned from the Singapore Writers Festival and the Singapore Literature Prize, while several boycotted a panel discussion hosted by the NLB.

A petition was signed by 3,800 signatories to reinstate the books or relocate the books to a different section, while another petition supporting the NLB's decision was signed by 26,000. A group supporting the reinstating of the affected books organised an event called "Let's Read Together" at the atrium of the National Library, where members of the public could bring books of any content to read along with a penguin stuffed toy, drawing 250 people on 13 July 2014. Communications and Information Minister Yaacob Ibrahim later instructed the NLB to place And Tango Makes Three and The White Swan Express in the adult section instead of pulping them; Who's in My Family? had already been pulped. The NLB also later announced that book selection and review processes would be refined.

== See also ==
- List of libraries in Singapore
- Asian Children's Festival
- Asian Film Archive
