= Geylang =

Planning Area and HDB town in Central Region, Singapore

- Planning Area and HDB town

Other transcription(s)
  - Malay: Geylang (Rumi) ݢيلڠ (Jawi)
  - Chinese: 芽笼 (Simplified) 芽籠 (Traditional); Yálóng (Pinyin); Gê-láng (Hokkien POJ)
  - Tamil: கேலாங் Kēlāṅ (Transliteration)
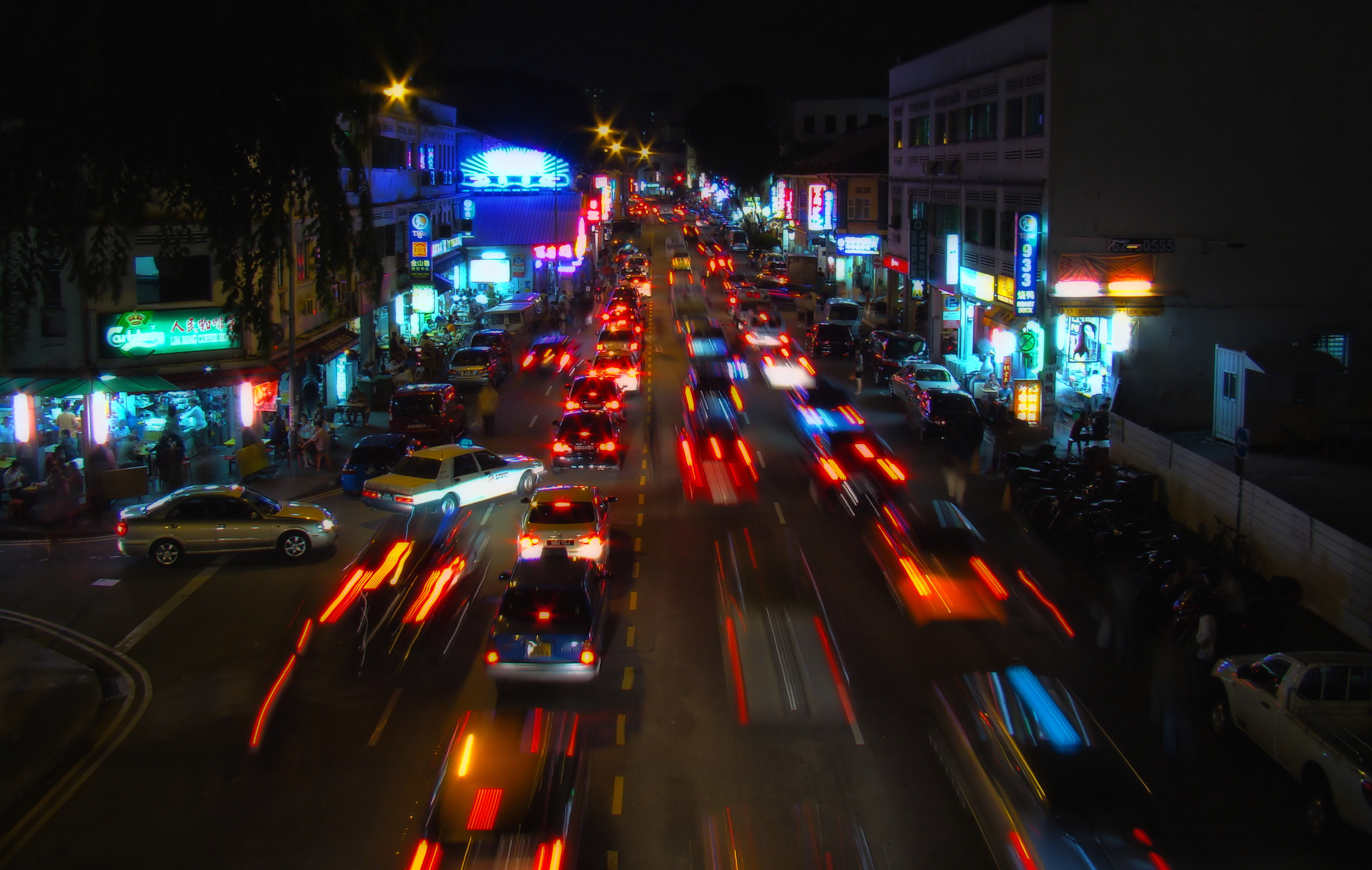
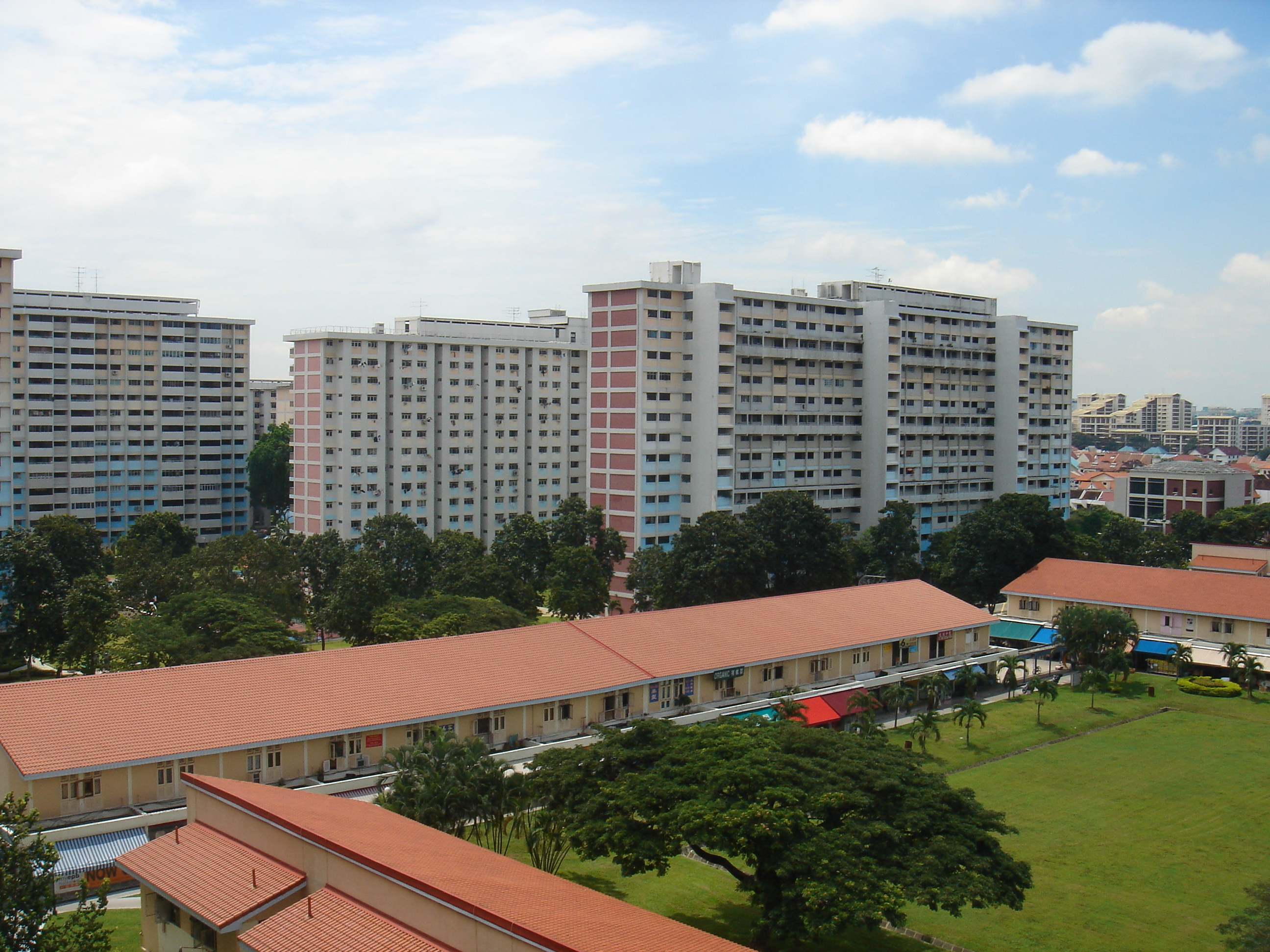
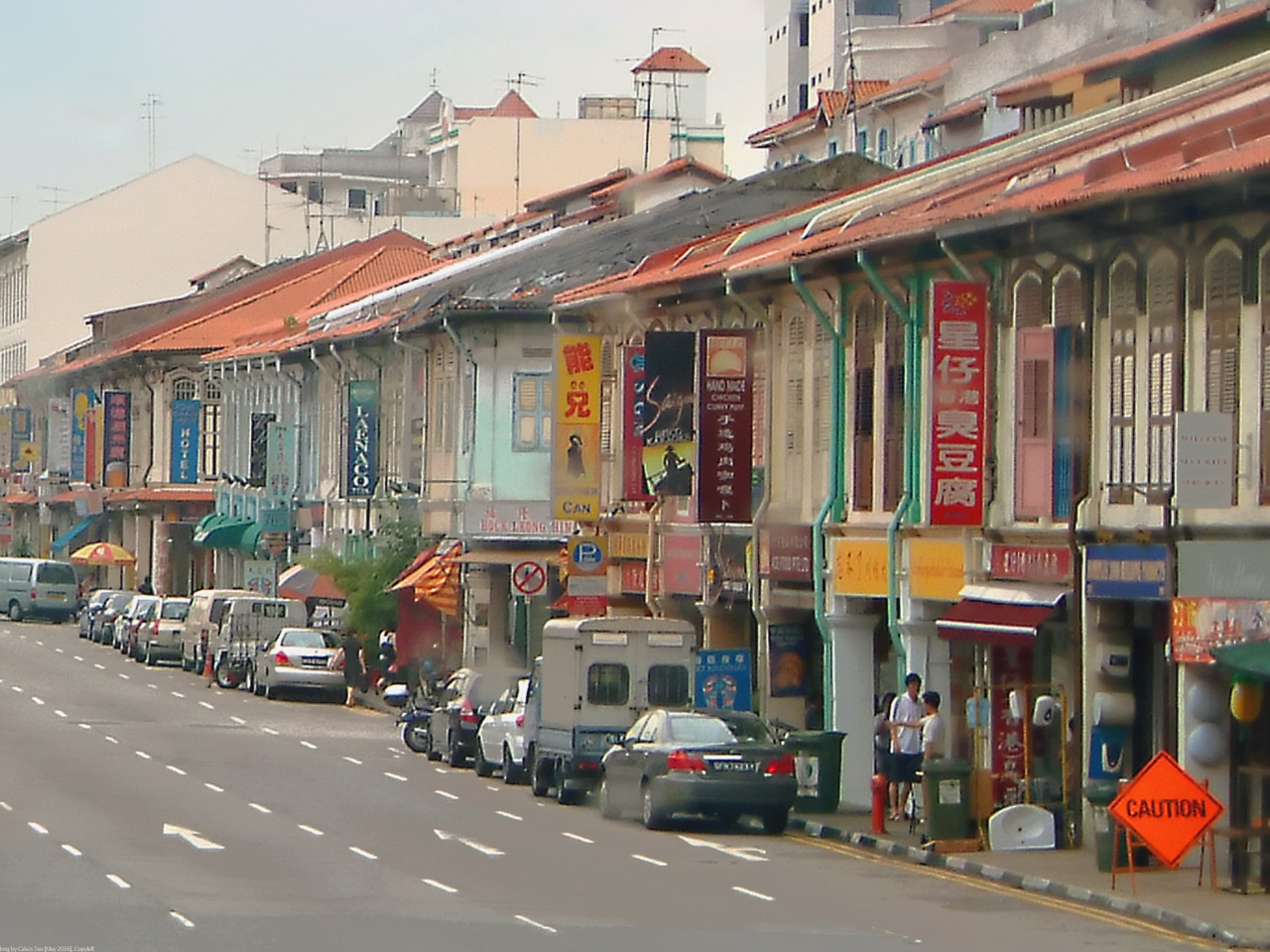
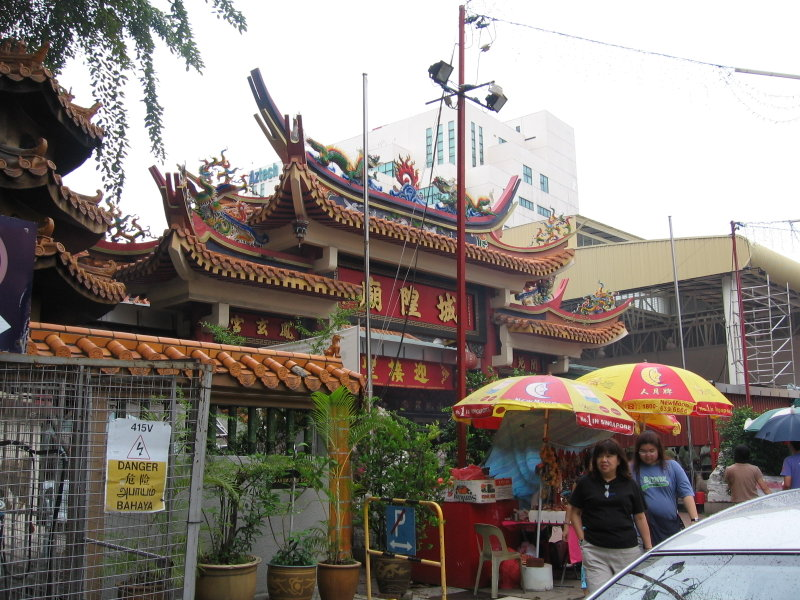
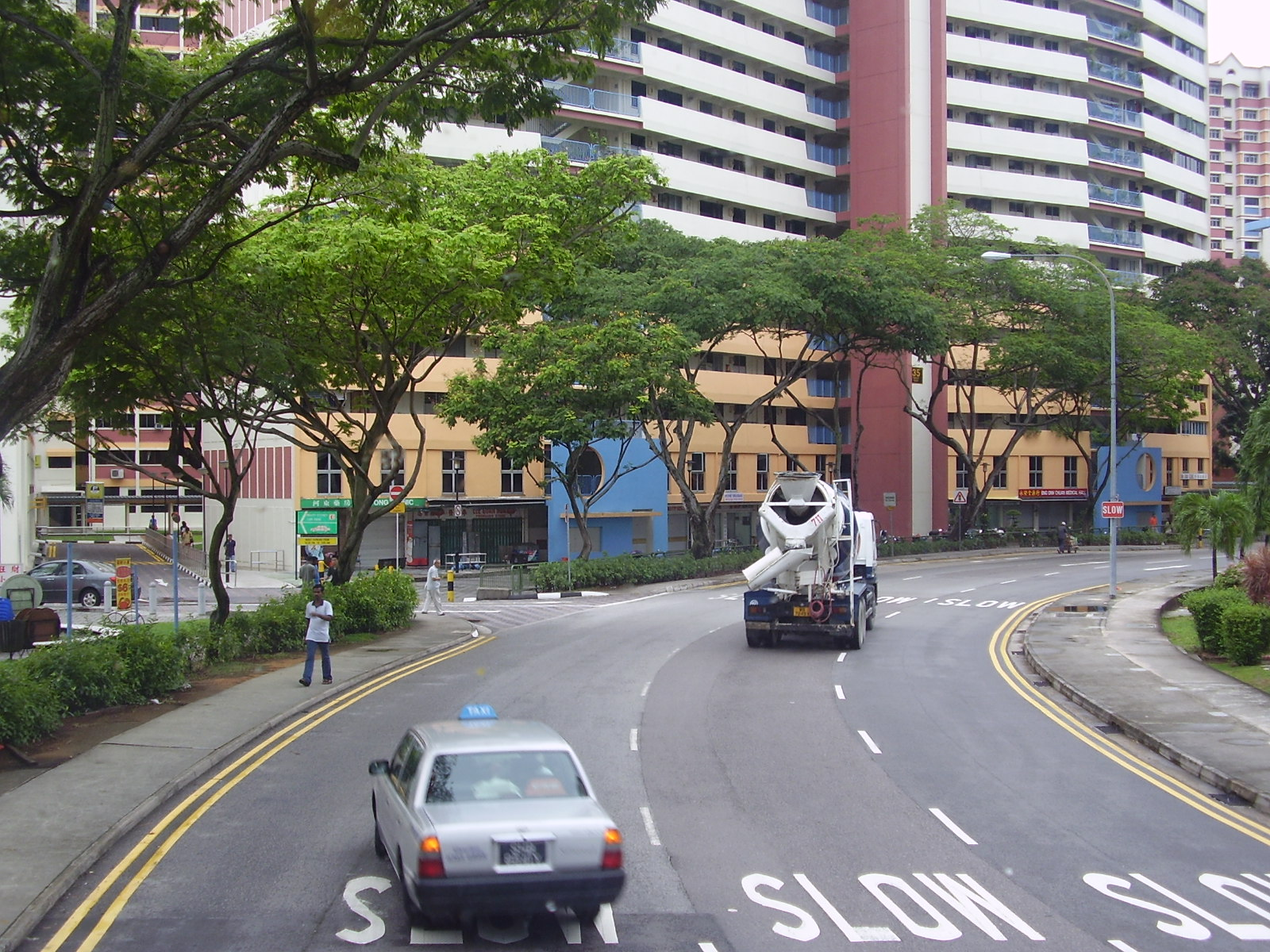
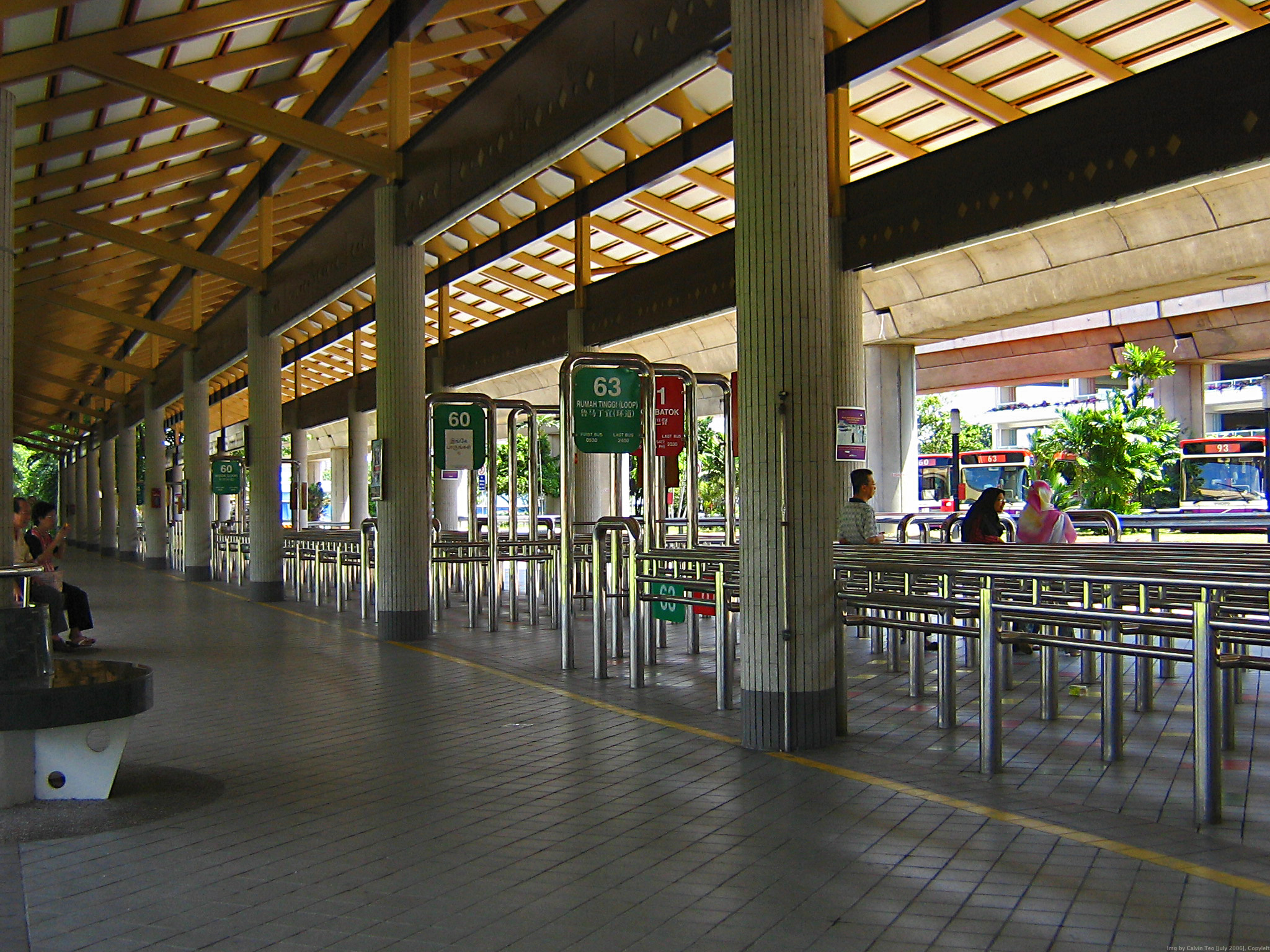
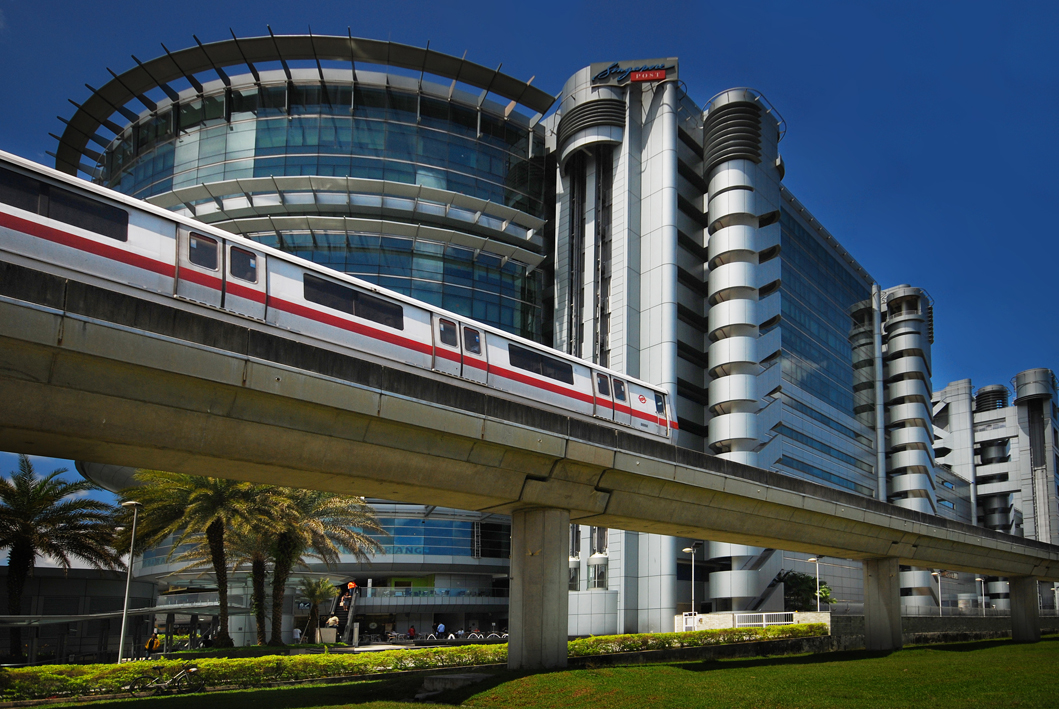
- From top left to right: Geylang Road at night, Aerial view of Geylang East, Shophouses along Geylang Road, Seng Ong Temple, Circuit Road, Eunos Bus Interchange, Headquarters of Singapore Post

- Location in Central Region

- Location of Geylang within Singapore
- Coordinates: 1°19′14″N 103°53′13″E
- Country: Singapore
- Region: Central Region
- CDCs: Central Singapore CDC; South East CDC
- Town councils: Jalan Besar Town Council; Marine Parade-Braddell Heights Town Council
- Constituencies: Jalan Besar GRC; Marine Parade-Braddell Heights GRC; Mountbatten SMC; Potong Pasir SMC

Government
  - Mayors: Central Singapore CDC: Denise Phua; South East CDC: Dinesh Vasu Dash
  - Members of Parliament: Jalan Besar GRC: Wan Rizal Wan Zakariah; Marine Parade-Braddell Heights GRC: Diana Pang; Tin Pei Ling; Goh Pei Ming; Mountbatten SMC: Gho Sze Kee; Potong Pasir SMC: Alex Yeo

Area
  - Total: 9.64 km^{2} (3.72 sq mi)
  - Residential: 2.14 km^{2} (0.83 sq mi)

Population (2026)
  - Total: 121,350
  - Density: 12,600/km^{2} (32,600/sq mi)

Ethnic groups
  - Chinese: 88,060
  - Malays: 15,280
  - Indians: 9,900
  - Others: 3,730
- Postal districts: 13, 14, 19
- Dwelling units: 29,256
- Projected ultimate: 49,000

Geylang (IPA: /ˈɡeɪlɑːŋ, -ʌŋ/) is a planning area located on the eastern fringe of the Central Region of Singapore, bordering Hougang and Toa Payoh in the north, Marine Parade in the south, Bedok in the east, and Kallang in the west.

Geylang was previously known as a red-light district, particularly the areas along Geylang Road. Today only 3-4 units remain for brothels and street walkers are hard to come by. Geylang is also where one of Singapore's oldest Malay settlements, Geylang Serai, is located. During Ramadan, the neighbourhood is famous for its popular and iconic Ramadan lights and bazaars.

== Etymology ==
The word Geylang is found early in Singapore's history and also in early topographical maps showing marsh and coconut plantations beside and adjacent to the mouth of the Kallang River, home to the Orang Laut (sea gypsies) called orang biduanda kallang who inhabited the area at the time of Raffles' arrival in 1819, and after whom the river is named. Geylang may be a corruption of Kallang. The place name appeared in an 1830 survey map of Singapore as Kilang, but by 1838 was spelled as Kelang, which when pronounced in correct Malay is nearly indistinguishable to the ear from Geylang. However, kilang also means press, mill, or factory in Malay and could be a reference to the presses and mills in the coconut plantations that used to be in the area. Another possible etymological link in the stock vocabulary of the Malay is geylanggan meaning to "twist" or "crush" a reference to the process of extracting the coconut meat and milk used by the locals to thicken curries in Malay-Chinese (Peranakan) cuisine.

Another possible explanation is that Geylang is a corruption of the Malay word 'gelang' which is a type of edible creeper (Portulaca oleracea). This is a plausible explanation for the name because Malays typically name places based on the abundance of certain plant species (e.g. Melaka after the eponyming tree) or geological formations (e.g. Bukit Gombak based on the comb-like hill summit).

== Geography ==
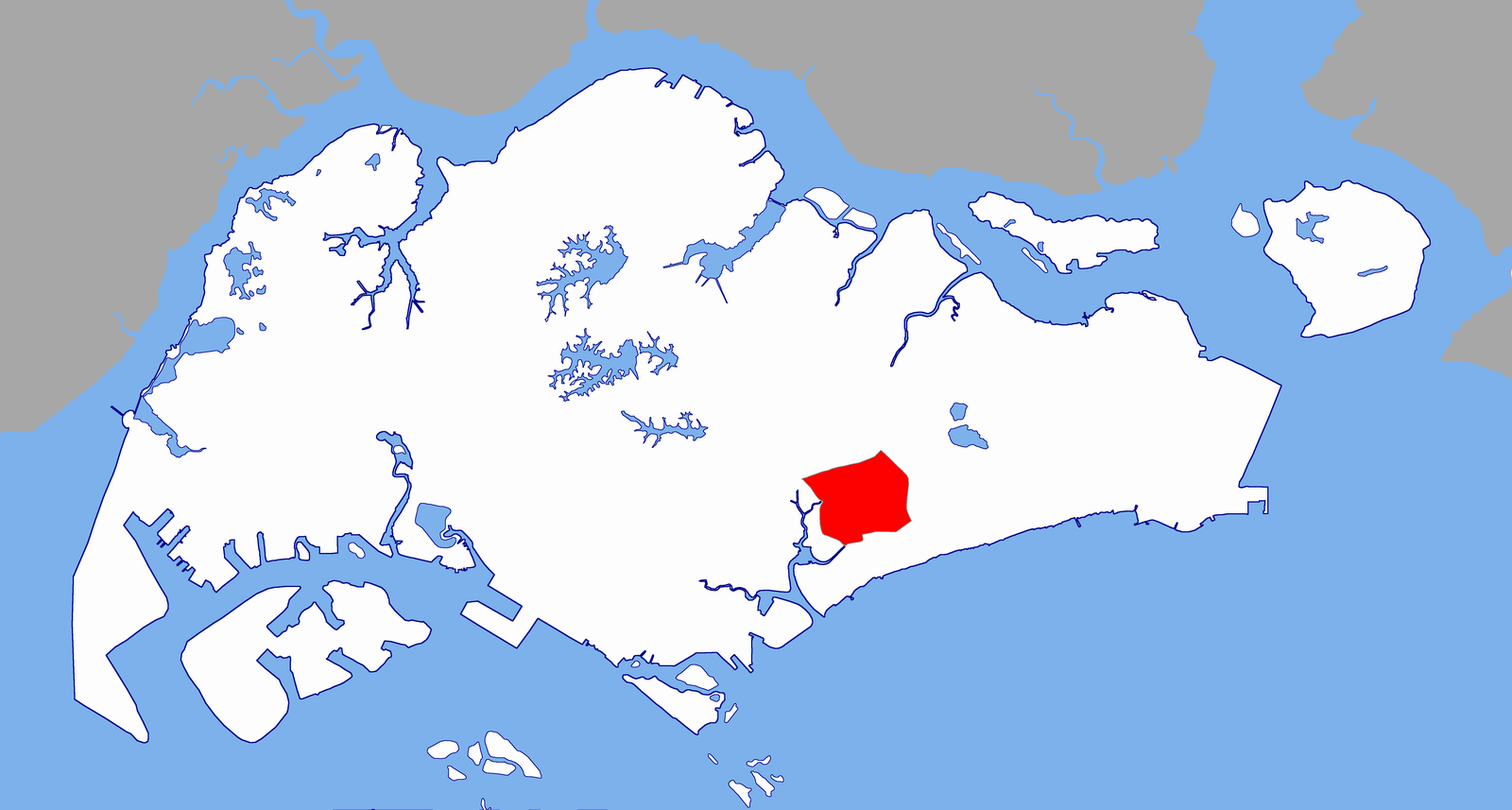
Geylang Planning Area on Singapore Island.

=== Location ===
Grouped under the Central Region, Geylang Planning Area is bordered by Hougang and Toa Payoh in the north, Kallang in the west, Marine Parade in the south, and Bedok in the east. Beginning in the north and moving in a clockwise direction, the boundaries of Geylang are made up of MacPherson Road, Airport Road, Eunos Link, Jalan Eunos, Still Road, Koon Seng Road, Dunman Road, the Geylang River, Mountbatten Road, Sims Way, and the Pan Island Expressway (PIE).

Geylang New Town as defined by the Housing and Development Board (HDB) sits within the Geylang Planning Area.

=== Subdivisions ===
Geylang Planning Area is made up of five "subzones", as officially defined by the Urban Redevelopment Authority (URA).

Subzone	Location	Notable places	Accessibility
Aljunied	Southwest Geylang	Aljunied MRT station, Mountbatten MRT station, Dakota MRT station, Sims Place Bus Terminal, Mountbatten Community Club, Mountbatten Neighbourhood Police Post, James Cook University Singapore, Kong Hwa School, Geylang Methodist School (Primary), Geylang Methodist School (Secondary), Broadrick Secondary School, Housing and Development Board (HDB) Geylang Branch, HDB Sims Drive Branch, Geylang Polyclinic, Geylang East Swimming Complex, Singapore Association for the Deaf, Mun San Fook Tuck Chee, the former Kallang Airport, the future Kallang Fire Station, the future Geylang Neighbourhood Police Centre	Aljunied MRT station, Mountbatten MRT station, Dakota MRT station and buses
Kallang Way	Industrial estates along Kallang Way, Kallang Pudding Road and Tannery Road	The Siemens Centre, Infineon building	Potong Pasir MRT Station and buses
MacPherson	Northern Geylang	MacPherson MRT station, Mattar MRT station, Canossa Catholic Primary School, Aljunied Park, MacPherson Community Club, MacPherson Neighbourhood Police Post	MacPherson MRT station, Mattar MRT station and buses
Geylang East	Southeast Geylang	Paya Lebar MRT station, Eunos MRT station, Paya Lebar Square, SingPost Centre, KINEX, Haig Girls' School, Geylang Serai Community Club, Kembangan-Chai Chee Community Club, Kampong Ubi Community Centre, Eunos Bus Interchange, Eunos Neighbourhood Police Post, Kampong Ubi Neighbourhood Police Post, Eunos Fire Post, Sri Sivan Temple, Foo Hai Ch'an Monastery, Geylang United Temple, Paya Lebar Quarter, Wisma Geylang Serai	Paya Lebar MRT station, Eunos MRT station and buses
Kampong Ubi	Northeast Geylang	Ubi MRT station, Traffic Police Headquarters, Singapore Civil Defence Force (SCDF) Headquarters, Paya Lebar Fire Station, Geylang Neighbourhood Police Centre, Maha Bodhi School, Manjusri Secondary School, Teochew Funeral Parlour, Sze Cheng Keng Temple	Ubi MRT station and buses

=== Political boundaries ===
Geylang was under the jurisdiction of four different constituencies as of the 2025 general election, with a majority of Geylang falls under the Marine Parade-Braddell Heights GRC, which comprises Geylang East, Kampong Ubi and MacPherson (which includes its former MacPherson SMC). Some parts of Geylang falls under different constituencies, with the western portions of Aljunied belonging to either (the Kolam Ayer division of) Jalan Besar GRC or the Mountbatten SMC, while a part of Kallang Way falls under Potong Pasir SMC.

== History ==
The development of Geylang can best be observed along the main trunk road, Geylang Road, that leads westwards towards the city. Micro-businesses founded by Malay, Indian and Chinese entrepreneurs seized start-up opportunities as mechanics in bicycle or motor repair workshops, suppliers of wood for making boats, houses, furniture and as merchants in iron, of floor and roofing tiles, in rubber and later plastics for all kinds of marine, industrial, factory and home use, including the mosaic of temples, mosques and churches in Geylang that have its roots serving local worshippers in search of spirituality and the divine.

One of the distinctive hallmarks of Geylang architecture is the preservation of its shophouses used by the clan (kinship) associations, set up as a (first) point of contact for newcomers in the migrant wave between 1840 and 1940 for integrating the newcomers into the ways and customs of locals. At present, the Geylang neighbourhood accurately reflects demographic changes in Singapore (2011) where out of every four Singaporeans, one is a foreigner.

As a strategic and military outpost for the British, it was important that the sea lanes off the Straits of Malacca were kept free of pirates, and open for shipping. As the British expanded in influence and power, Singapore served East and West interests as a natural deep-harbour destination that played host to the French, Portuguese, Dutch and other European navies and their men. Other seaports in Asia, from Shanghai to Calcutta, also played a role in the traffic of women and girls for prostitution.

== Geylang Serai ==
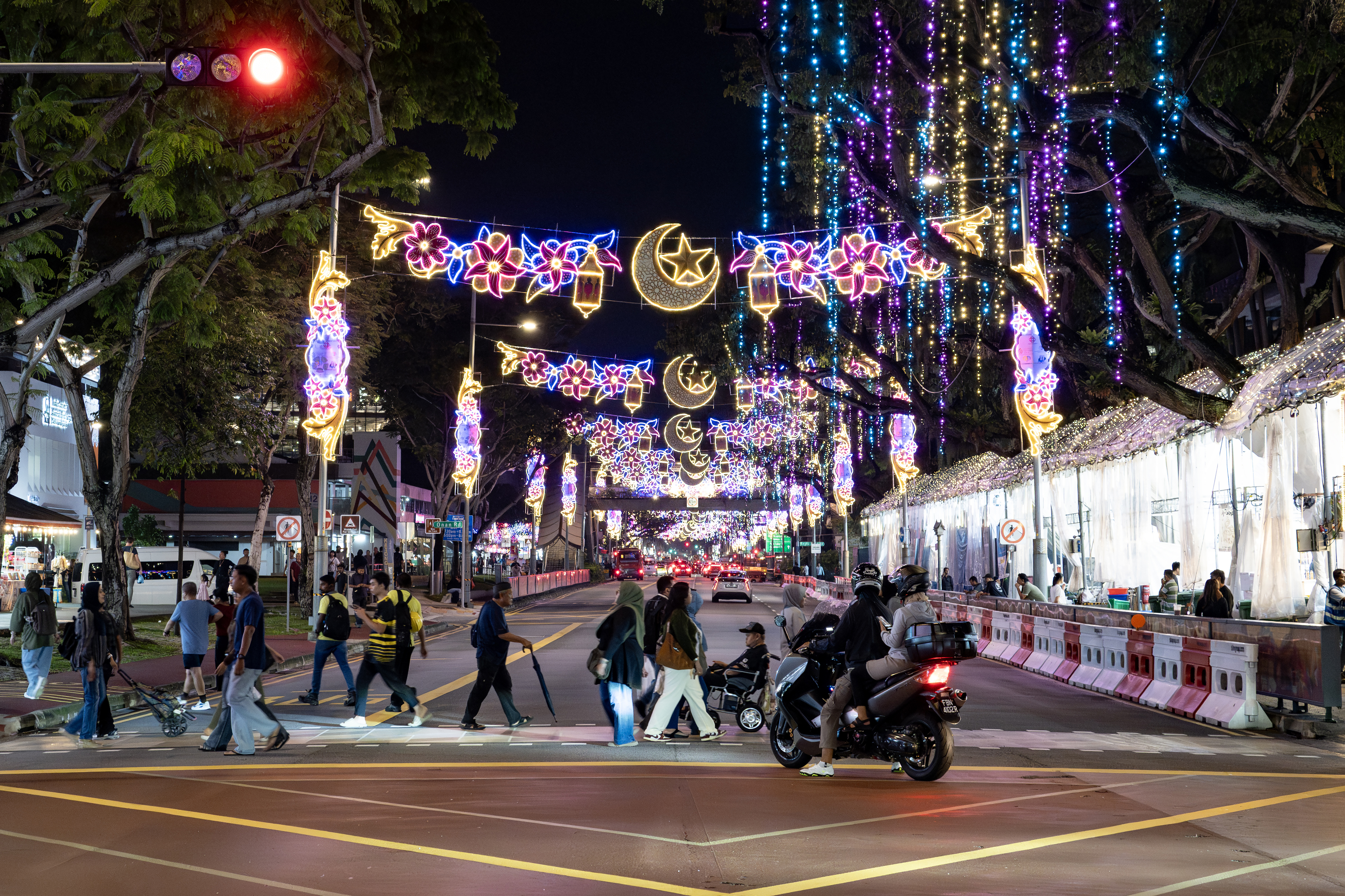
Geylang Serai Hari Raya Light-Up 2026. The annual illumination event welcomes the Muslim fasting month of Ramadan.

Geylang Serai was used to be the terminus of the vintage tramway while the farmers staying there already shifted to cultivate other cash crops, including rubber and coconuts. Meanwhile, with the intensified urbanisation, the rural community in Geylang Serai, where the price of land was low, was turned into a suburb.

During the Japanese Occupation, Geylang Serai was severely damaged, and the shortages of food that arose afterwards led to the replacement of the plantations of coconut and rubber by those of tapioca, which gave Geylang Serai the name, Kampong Ubi (tapioca in Malay). With the end of Japanese occupation, Geylang Serai saw a rise in population and more areas were occupied. The inflow of more Malays and outflow of Chinese changed the demographic of Geylang Serai, which turned into predominantly a Malay community ever since. In 1963, the Housing and Development Board (HDB) initiated The Geylang Serai Housing Redevelopment Scheme which was carried out in three phases, investing a sum of 3.8 million SGD for the renewal of the region. Under the scheme, Many HDB flats and new facilities were constructed, including Taj cinema, Concourse, light industrial properties, shopping malls and Geylang Serai market. The old kampungs in the region vanished and Geylang Serai turned into a modern residential district.

In tandem with the urbanization of the region, the importance of preservation of Malay cultural heritage was recognized by the government. The namesake of Geylang Serai was retained and it is not just confined to Geylang Serai alone, but Tampines West, Fengshan, Compassvale, Kembangan, Keat Hong, Marsiling, Woodlands, Jalan Kayu, Cheng San, Marina South, Pasir Ris East, Tampines Changkat and Toa Payoh East are also Malay districts with the racial harmony policy. Under the Masterplan of 2008 by the Urban Redevelopment Authority (URA), the development of the Paya Lebar Central which includes Paya Lebar Square, Paya Lebar Quarter and SingPost Centre, within which Geylang Serai is situated, into a centre characterised with a distinct cultural identity was confirmed. Until now, Geylang Serai market is still one of the busiest and largest wet markets in Singapore, offering many Indian-Muslim and Malay dishes as well as a large variety of spices and ingredient for making of traditional Malay cuisine, such as cinnamon and nutmeg.

Geylang Serai is also the site of Singapore's annual Ramadan light-up. The event has been held for decades and dates back to at least 2004.

== Infrastructure ==
Geylang's combination of shophouse scenery and hectic day and night life, including foreign workers quarters and karaoke lounges, provides an alternative view of elements the rest of modern Singapore generally does not offer. Shophouses along Geylang Road form part of the Geylang Conservation Area and are protected from redevelopment, and many restaurants have sprung up along this major road. Geylang is also known for its durian shops; as well as many shops offering traditional Malay folk medicine which despite playing as important a role as traditional Chinese medicine does not receive as much attention and endorsement from the Singapore government as the latter.

=== Shopping malls ===
The Geylang planning area consists of 9 shopping malls, with a concentration of shopping malls located near Paya Lebar MRT station:

- Pavilion Square
- Paya Lebar Square
- Paya Lebar Quarter (PLQ)
- SingPost Centre
- Grandlink Square
- KINEX
- City Plaza
- Tanjong Katong Complex
- Joo Chiat Complex

=== Places of worship ===
==== Cheng Beng Buddhist Society ====
Cheng Beng Buddhist Society was founded in 1961 by Wen Ming Hu and other lay Buddhists, has been organising workshops and services for the Buddhist community. The Buddhist centre was renamed as "Vimalakirti Buddhist Centre" in 2012.

==== Foo Hai Ch'an Monastery ====
Foo Hai Ch'an Monastery (Chinese: 福海禪寺) is a Chinese Buddhist monastery founded in 1935 by Venerable Hong Zong, the current premise is located at Geylang East Avenue 2. The monastery conducted Buddhist study courses for laity which was divided into beginner, intermediate and advanced classes forming a three-year curriculum. One of the monastery's subsidiary is known as Foo Hai Buddhist Culture and Welfare Association which managed the operations of two childcare centres and three senior rehabilitation centres.

==== Masjid Haji Mohd Salleh ====
Masjid Haji Mohd Salleh
- Jawi: مسجد الحاج محمد صالح
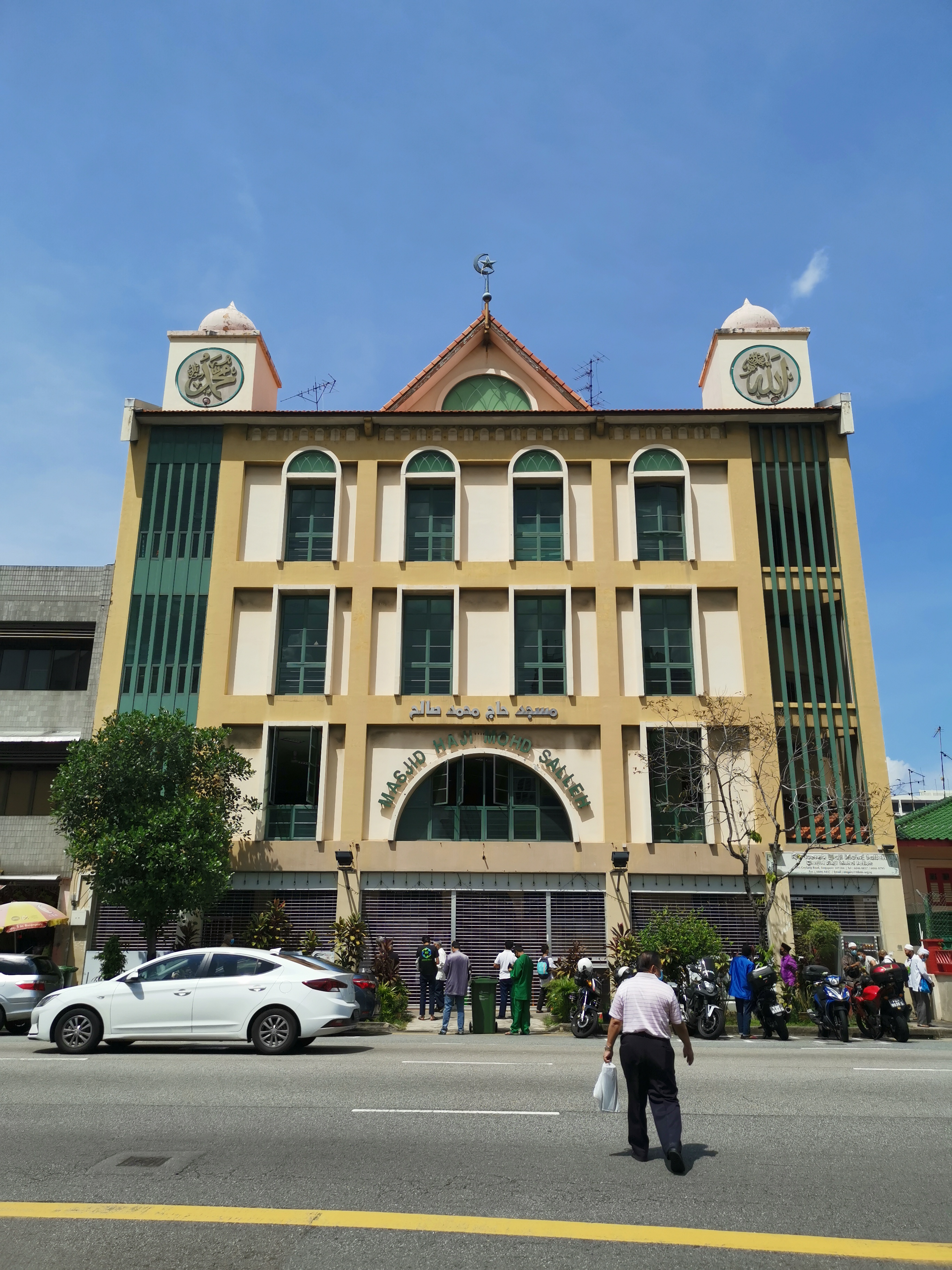
- Main facade of the mosque, overlooking Geylang Road.

- Location in Singapore

Religion
- Affiliation: Sunni Islam

Location
- Location: 245 Geylang Rd, Singapore 389304
- Country: Singapore
- Coordinates: 1.3123374°N 103.8769032°E

Architecture
- Completed: 1998

Specifications
- Capacity: 2,000
- Dome: 2

Masjid Haji Mohd Salleh (Jawi: مسجد الحاج محمد صالح) is a mosque located along 245 Geylang Road. It was founded in 1896 by an Indian Muslim trader, Haji Mohammed Salleh, on land owned by another Indian merchant, Vena Meena Bok. The mosque has been rebuilt twice; once in 1959 and later in 1998 when it was deemed too small. The current structure is the 1998 reconstruction which added four storeys to the mosque and was opened in 1999.

The mosque has been criticized for being situated adjacent to the red light district. However, the mosque administration deliberately ignores the social stigma of its surroundings and instead continues active operations with its daily prayers, Friday prayers and Islamic classes including kindergartens.

==== Masjid Khadijah ====
Masjid Khadijah
- Jawi: مسجد خديجة
- Location in Singapore

Religion
- Affiliation: Sunni Islam

Location
- Location: 583 Geylang Road, Singapore 389522
- Country: Singapore
- Coordinates: 1.3140472°N 103.8861230°E

Architecture
- Architect: Hiladt Architects
- Funded by: Khadijah binte Mohamed
- Established: 1915
- Completed: 1920

Masjid Khadijah (Jawi: مسجد خديجة; Khadijah Mosque) is a Sufi mosque that contains the headquarters of the Religious Rehabilitation Group (RRG), a society dedicated to combating religious extremism. It is named for Khadijah binte Mohammed, a Muslim merchant who donated $50,000 as waqf to build the mosque. Excavations during the renovations revealed that there were graves along the left side of the wall as well, which have been exhumed.

==== Soon Thian Keing ====
Soon Thian Keing (Chinese: 順天宮) is a Taoist temple dedicated to Tua Pek Kong, the temple was recognised in the Singapore Book of Records as the oldest Chinese Temple in Singapore, established during the reign of Qing Dynasty's Emperor Jiaqing (1796 - 1821). The temple relocated to its present location at Lorong 29 Geylang and was officially opened in 1994.

== Notable places ==
=== Former notable places ===
- Queen's Theatre, Singapore

== Transport ==
=== Roads ===
The Geylang area is composed of north and south sections that are divided by Geylang Road which stretches for about three kilometres. Throughout the length of Geylang Road, there are lanes (lorong in Malay) that extend perpendicularly from the main road. The lanes in the north are given odd numbered names (i.e. Lorong 1, Lorong 3, Lorong 5 and so on), and the lanes in the south are given even numbered names (i.e. Lorong 2, Lorong 4, Lorong 6 and so on).

The following expressways pass through Geylang:

- Pan Island Expressway (PIE) connects Geylang with Changi Airport, Tampines, Bedok, Kallang, Toa Payoh, Clementi, Jurong East, Jurong West and Tuas;
- Kallang-Paya Lebar Expressway (KPE) connects Geylang with Kallang, Hougang, Sengkang and Punggol.

Major roads within Geylang Planning Area include Aljunied Road, Kallang Way, Paya Lebar Road, Geylang East Central, Ubi Avenue 2 and Circuit Road.

=== Trains ===
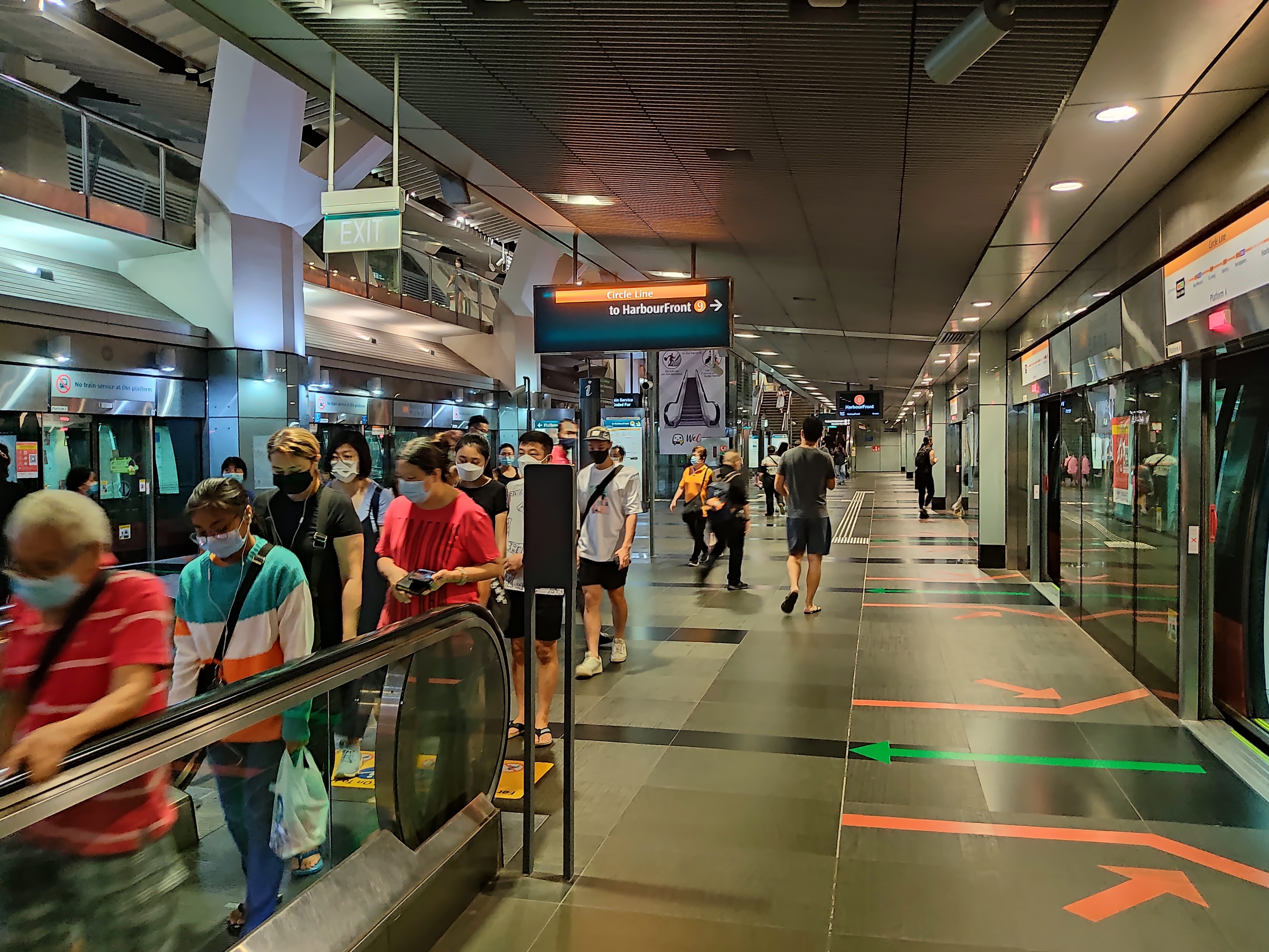
Paya Lebar MRT Station

There are currently eight Mass Rapid Transit (MRT) stations in the Geylang Planning Area across three lines: The East West line, the Circle line and the Downtown line.

The eight stations are:

- EW7 Eunos
- EW8 CC9 Paya Lebar
- EW9 Aljunied
- CC7 Mountbatten
- CC8 Dakota
- CC10 DT26 MacPherson
- DT25 Mattar
- DT27 Ubi

== Cultural depiction ==
- Living in Geylang, a 20-episode television drama aired on MediaCorp Channel 8 in 1998
- Pleasure Factory, a 2007 Singaporean-Thai docudrama film set in Geylang
- Geylang, a 2022 crime thriller film starring Mark Lee and Sheila Sim
