= Geylang Methodist School (Secondary) =

- 芽笼美以美中学; Sekolah Menengah Methodist Geylang

Location
- 2 Geylang East Central, Singapore 389705; Singapore; 1.3177°N 103.8827°E

Information
- Former names: Geylang Methodist Girls' School; Geylang Methodist Secondary School
- Type: Government-aided
- Motto: To grow in friendship, body and mind
- Denomination: Methodist
- Established: 1924; 102 years ago
- Founders: Rev. Lloyd Sullivan; Mrs. Chia Han Kiat; Miss Walker
- Session: Single-session
- School code: 7005
- Principal: Mr Victor Owyong
- Gender: Mixed
- Age range: 13 - 17
- Enrollment: approx. 1,300+
- Houses: Mitchell; Archer; Lau; Means
- Color: Red Gold Blue
- Affiliation: Geylang Methodist School (Primary); Anglo-Chinese Junior College
- Website: geylangmethodistsec.moe.edu.sg

Geylang Methodist School (Secondary) (GMS(S)) is a co-educational government-aided Methodist secondary school located in Geylang, Singapore. Founded in 1924, the school offers secondary education leading to the Singapore-Cambridge GCE Ordinary Level or Singapore-Cambridge GCE Normal Level examinations. The incumbent principal is Mr Victor Owyong.

== History ==
Geylang Methodist School (Secondary) was founded in 1924 as Geylang Methodist Girls' School by Rev Lloyd Sullivan, Mrs Chia Han Kiat and Miss Walker, who were members of the Methodist Church. The school began with an enrolment of 27 girls, with lessons conducted in the Geylang Chinese Methodist Church, offering primary-level education.

During the Japanese occupation of Singapore, the school ceased operations. Its grounds were repurposed as military barracks until its abandonment in 1943 by the Japanese. Following the Japanese occupation, the school was re-opened in January 1946.

The school became a Government-aided school in 1948. Enrolment reached 320 pupils, and Standard V was introduced. By 1950, the school started to offer secondary-level education to its pupils. Students sat for the Cambridge examination for the first time in 1954.

The school continued to expand as enrolment reached 580 in 1973. The school further expanded in 1974 with the opening of a new extension block. The school song was composed by Mariam Jean Gruber and Susheela Daniel in 1975.

In 1983, the school moved into its current site at 2 Geylang East Central, and split into two schools – the Primary School and the Secondary School. In 1984, the school went co-education with the intake of boys, and was renamed as Geylang Methodist Secondary School.

In 1999, the school transitioned to being single-session after upgrading works. The school also temporarily operated at Victoria School's old campus, 3 Geylang Bahru Lane, while its campus underwent Programme for Rebuilding and Improving Existing Schools (PRIME) in June 2005.

It was renamed Geylang Methodist School (Secondary) on 1 January 2007, and returned to its current campus in June that year.

== Academic information ==
Geylang Methodist School (Secondary) offers three academic streams, namely the four-year Express course, as well as the Normal Course, comprising Normal (Academic) and Normal (Technical) academic tracks.

=== GCE O Level Express Course ===
The Express Course is a nationwide four-year programme that leads up to the Singapore-Cambridge GCE Ordinary Level examination.

==== Academic subjects ====
The examinable academic subjects for Singapore-Cambridge GCE Ordinary Level offered by Geylang Methodist School (Secondary) for upper secondary level (via. streaming in secondary 2 level), as of 2017, are listed below.

Notes:

1. Subjects indicated with ' * ' are mandatory subjects.
2. All students in Singapore are required to undertake a Mother Tongue Language as an examinable subject, as indicated by ' ^ '.
3. "SPA" in Pure Science subjects refers to the incorporation of School-based Science Practical Assessment, which 20% of the subject result in the national examination are determined by school-based practical examinations, supervised by the Singapore Examinations and Assessment Board. The SPA Assessment has been replaced by one Practical Assessment in the 2018 O Levels.

Sciences	Language & Humanities	Arts & Aesthetics
Additional Mathematics*; Mathematics*; Physics (SPA); Chemistry (SPA)*; Biology (SPA); Science (Combined)	English Language*; Mother Tongue Language* ^ (Chinese and Malay); Higher Chinese Language; Geography; History; Combined Humanities (Social Studies & another Humanities subject at elective level)*	Art; Design & Technology; Food & Nutrition; Music

=== Normal Course ===
The Normal Course is a nationwide four-year programme leading to the Singapore-Cambridge GCE Normal Level examination, which runs either the Normal (Academic) curriculum or Normal (Technical) curriculum, abbreviated as N(A) and N(T) respectively.

==== Normal (Academic) Course ====
In the Normal (Academic) course, students offer 5–8 subjects in the Singapore-Cambridge GCE Normal Level examination. Compulsory subjects include:

- English Language
- Mother Tongue Language
- Mathematics
- Combined Humanities

A 5th year leading to the Singapore-Cambridge GCE Ordinary Level examination is available to N(A) students who perform well in their Singapore-Cambridge GCE Normal Level examination. Students can move from one course to another based on their performance and the assessment of the school principal and teachers.

==== Normal (Technical) Course ====
The Normal (Technical) course prepares students for a technical-vocational education at the Institute of Technical Education. Students will offer 5–7 subjects in the Singapore-Cambridge GCE Normal Level examination. The curriculum is tailored towards strengthening students’ proficiency in English and Mathematics. Students take English Language, Mathematics, Basic Mother Tongue and Computer Applications as compulsory subjects.
