= Masjid Omar Salmah =

Mosque at Thomson, Singapore

Masjid Omar Salmah مسجد عمر سلمة
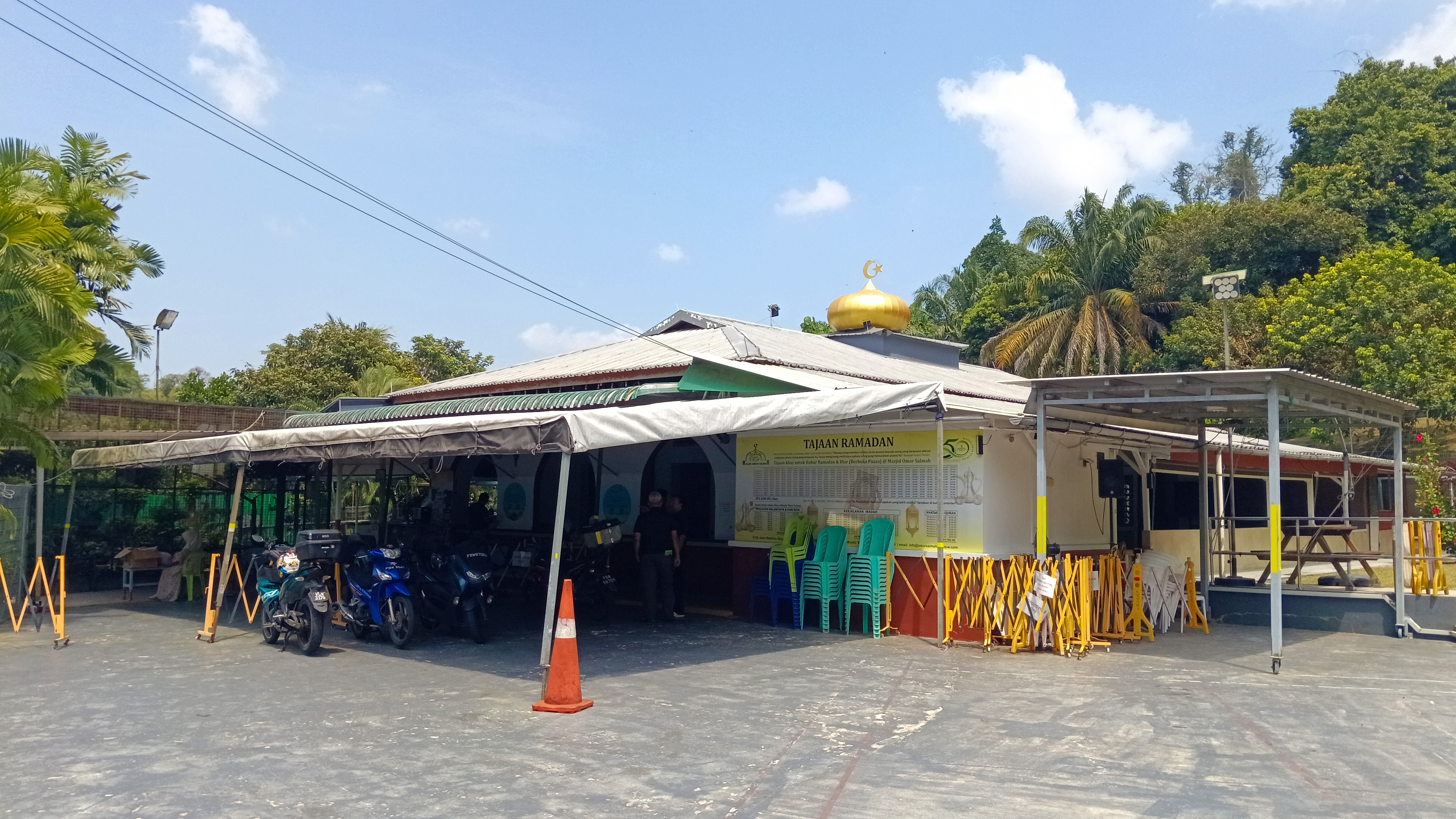

- Location in Singapore

Religion
- Affiliation: Sunni Islam

Location
- Location: 411B Jalan Mashhor, Singapore 299173
- Country: Singapore
- Coordinates: 1.3346286°N 103.8319658°E

Architecture
- Type: Mosque
- Style: Islamic architecture
- Founder: Syed Ibrahim bin Omar Alsagoff
- Completed: 1973

Masjid Omar Salmah (Jawi: مسجد عمر سلمة) is a mosque located along Jalan Mashhor in the Caldecott area off Thomson Road in of Novena, Singapore. Built in 1973, it is situated in a rural, forested area and has gained the reputation of being one of the few village-styled mosques in the country. It is adjacent to the Caldecott MRT station.

== History ==
The first mosque along Jalan Mashhor was established in 1970 and completed in October 1973, holding the first Friday prayer during its opening ceremony which was led by Ya'acob bin Mohamed. It was built by Syed Ibrahim Alsagoff, a merchant from the Alsagoff family and a diplomat from Saudi Arabia, who also named the mosque after his parents, Syed Omar Alsagoff and Salmah. In 1975, the Majlis Ugama Islam Singapura (MUIS) authorized the mosque as an official place for the collection of the Zakat al-Fitr tax. The mosque was originally administered by the Persatuan Bawean Singapura (PBS), a local Muslim social group, but was later handed over to the MUIS in 1984 after reports that the PBS neglected the maintenance of the mosque and left it in a dilapidated condition. Along with Masjid Ahmad Ibrahim and Masjid Al-Firdaus, Masjid Omar Salmah was also given a Temporary Occupation License which required yearly rental payments to retain the mosque.

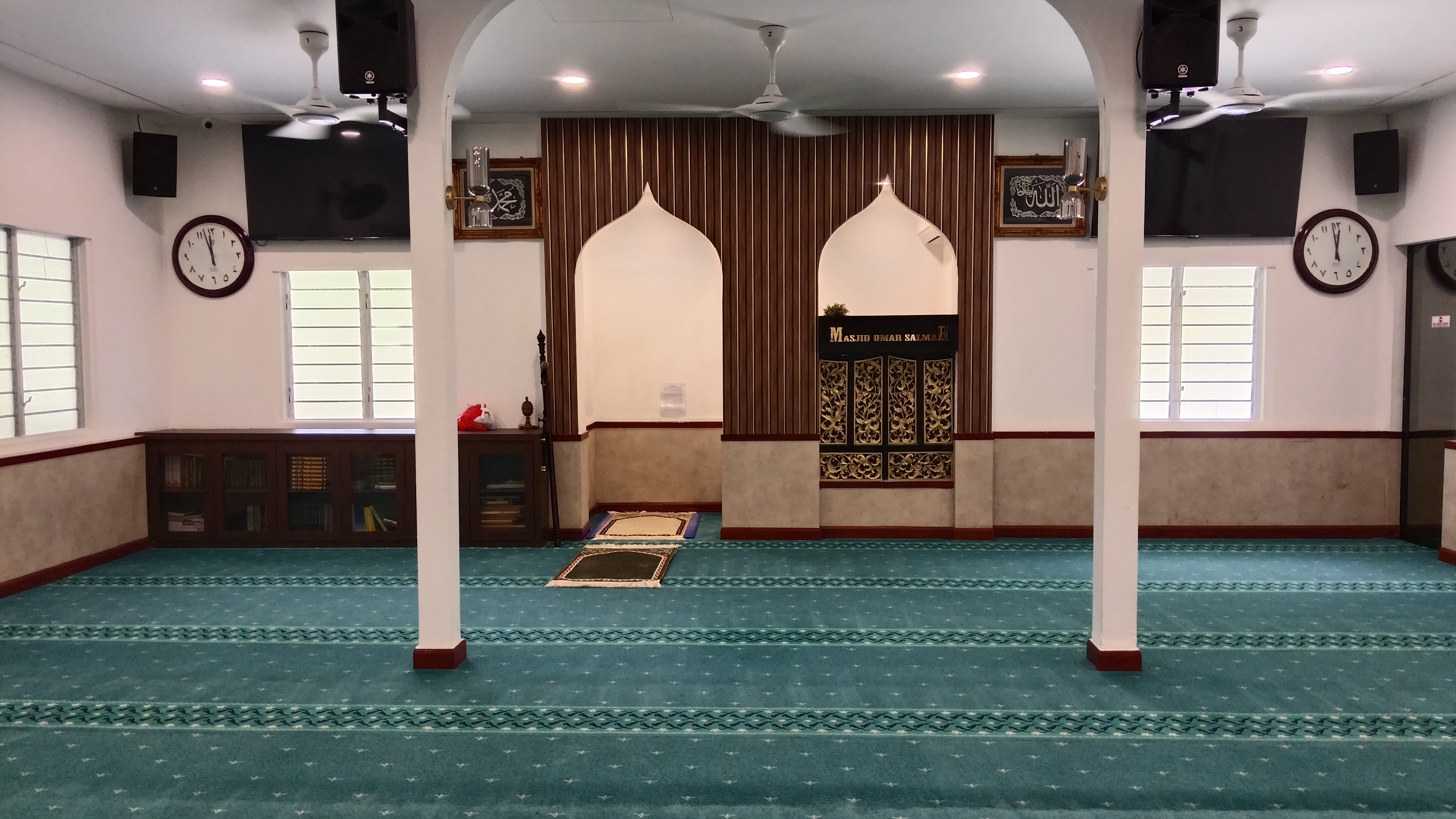
The main prayer hall of the mosque, with the mihrab visible.

By the early 2000s, Masjid Omar Salmah had gained notability amongst the public as one of the few remaining mosques that held the vibe of a typical Malay village. In 2011, the National Equestrian Centre was built next to the mosque. During the nationwide COVID-19 pandemic, the mosque was shut down as part of a nationwide mosque closure, but later reopened after the circuit breaker period had ended.

The mosque is an unofficial heritage site amongst Muslim residents in the Toa Payoh and Novena areas, especially former residents of Kampong Jantai, a village that was cleared in the 1990s for urbanization along Mount Pleasant Road.

== Architecture ==
Masjid Omar Salmah resembles a traditional surau, with a zinc roof and a carpeted main prayer hall. The mosque is situated atop a concrete platform which is fenced from all sides, with openings that serve as entrances. Wooden furnishings of the mosque, including the minbar, are crafted by hand.

== Transportation ==
The mosque is accessible from the Caldecott MRT station, located along the Circle Line and Thomson–East Coast MRT Line. It is also situated along Jalan Mashhor, in a forested area of Caldecott off Thomson Road, all within the Novena planning area.

== See also ==
- List of mosques in Singapore
