= Murder of Usharani Ganaison =

1977 sexual assault and murder of a girl by her uncle in Singapore

Usharani d/o Ganaison
- Usharani Ganaison, the 7-year-old girl molested and killed
- Born: Usharani d/o Ganaison; 1970; Singapore
- Died: 10 November 1977 or 11 November 1977 (aged 7); Toa Payoh, Singapore
- Cause of death: Murdered by strangulation
- Resting place: Choa Chu Kang cemetery
- Other names: Usha Rani Ganaison; Usharani Genaison
- Education: Primary One at Cairnhill Primary School (incomplete due to her death)
- Occupation: Student
- Known for: Murder victim
- Father: N. Ganesan

On the night of 10 November 1977, Usharani d/o Ganaison, a 7-year-old student of Cairnhill Primary School, went missing after she went out of her flat to buy drinks to celebrate Deepavali with her family. About seven hours after her disappearance, she was found murdered nearby the void deck of her flat, and the medical evidence suggested that she had been molested and strangled.

Two days after her murder, Usharani's uncle Kalidass s/o Sinnathamby Narayanasamy, a lance corporal of the Singapore Armed Forces, was arrested after a denture mark on Usharani's body was matched to his teeth. Although Kalidass admitted to molesting the girl, he denied killing her intentionally and raised a defence of alcohol intoxication that caused him to be mentally incapable of his actions. However, the trial court found Kalidass mentally sound at the time of the killing, and thus sentenced him to death for murder on 27 March 1980.

== Disappearance and murder ==
On the night of 10 November 1977, at their flat in Toa Payoh, seven-year-old Usharani Ganaison, the youngest of three daughters in her family, went outside upon her 30-year-old father N Ganesan's request to buy drinks from a nearby coffee shop for their guests, who all came to celebrate Deepavali, which fell on the same day. She was last seen leaving the flat at about 11.30pm. However, Usharani did not return fifteen minutes after leaving the flat. Usha's elder sister also could not find Usharani at the coffee shop when her parents sent her to find her youngest sister. Later, the family and friends of Usharani went to search the whole neighbourhood for Usharani, and even sought help from a nearby passing patrol car to find the girl. However, up until 4am, they were unable to find Usharani and so they reported her disappearance to the police.

Seven hours after Usharani's family made a missing persons report, at 11.30am, a family friend found her naked body partially hidden underneath the ramp. The friend's father and a few relatives rushed down immediately, finding her body, and called the police. The police arrived at the scene, and they identified the girl as Usharani. Professor Chao Tzee Cheng, the senior forensic pathologist, examined the body during an autopsy and he determined that the girl had been strangled, and she was sexually assaulted. According to Usharani's father, who worked as a labourer, he stated that he was proud of Usharani, who often aced in her examinations and schoolwork, and was the brightest out of his three daughters. The family were filled with heartbreak about Usharani's unfortunate death, and they later buried her at Choa Chu Kang cemetery after a funeral.

== Arrest and media effect ==
Two days after Usharani was killed, the police arrested a suspect, whom they revealed was the victim's 23-year-old uncle who was a soldier. The uncle, Lance Corporal Kalidass s/o Sinnathamby Narayanasamy of the Singapore Armed Forces, was charged with murder on 14 November 1977, and it was revealed by the police that he admitted to the molestation and killing of the victim. The case of Kalidass was transferred from the district courts to the High Court in April 1978 for trial hearing on a later date.

The case of Usharani's sexual assault and murder made headlines in Singapore newspapers and just less than a month after her death was reported, another schoolgirl Cheng Geok Ha, who was ten, went missing on 25 November 1977 before she was discovered dead in the following month, with signs of her being sexually assaulted before her death; Cheng's neighbour Quek Kee Siong was later arrested for the murder and sentenced to hang on 6 March 1979. In January 1978, the murder of Usharani was reported as one of the top ten most shocking news ever covered by the media in the year 1977 itself.

== Murder trial and defence ==
Kalidass Sinnathamby Narayanasamy, a lance corporal of the Singapore Armed Forces who was accused in court for molesting and killing his niece

On 18 March 1980, Kalidass Sinnathamby Narayanasamy stood trial for the charge of killing his seven-year-old niece Usharani Ganaison, with Christopher Lau representing him in court. The two trial judges Choor Singh and T. S. Sinnathuray presided the trial hearing, and the trial prosecutor was Sowaran Singh.

Professor Chao Tzee Cheng, the pathologist who examined the victim's body, testified that the cause of death was asphyxia by strangulation. Professor Chao discovered bite marks and bruises on the body, and he certified that the girl was sexually assaulted due to the cuts and bruises at her hymen and vagina, but he stated that these injuries were not caused by the sexual organ penetrating the vagina, but rather by another object like a human finger. Djeng Shih Kien, a former senior lecturer of dentistry at the National University of Singapore, was also consulted to test the bite marks on Usharani's body and he matched the bite mark and single-tooth denture to Kalidass's mouth, which further implicated Kalidass as the last person who was with Usharani before she was killed. The case was known to be a rare case where a denture mark was relied on in catching the real killer of a murder case.

Kalidass confessed to the police that he molested his niece, but denied killing her intentionally due to him being drunk when he committed the crime. He claimed that he drank alcohol all the way from morning to night on the day he killed Usharani, and he testified that on the night itself, after he left his friend's flat, he coincidentally met Usharani, and brought her to a bus stop, where he molested her by groping her private parts before he took her to the ramp nearby her home, and strangled her after a sexual assault of the girl. Although he later claimed in trial that he was tortured by the detective D. Rajoo into confessing since his identity card and driver's license happened to be discovered nearby the crime scene, Kalidass's police statement was admitted as evidence.

Some of Kalidass's friends also testified in court that Kalidass had told them he killed a person on the night of Deepavali, and his girlfriend also heard Kalidass stating he lost the denture tooth due to a fight with his brother when she noticed it missing. Under cross-examination by the prosecution, Kalidass admitted he cannot remember if he caused the bite wounds on Usharani, and stated he sort of recalled he did something terrible to his niece, but fearful to go back there to check her state or retrieve his identity card and driver's license, which he found to have dropped at the place he killed Usharani. He kept stating he did not know or did not remember when asked about the events of the night.

Kalidass also put up a defence of intoxication by alcohol, which made him mentally impaired at the time of the killing. He also stated that as a result of the effects of alcohol, he had no memory of how he strangled Usharani and had a black-out after he molested the girl, before he woke up and fled the scene, leaving the deceased girl at the ramp. Dr Paul Ngui, a private psychiatrist, was called to support Kalidass's defence. However, in rebuttal, the government psychiatrist Chee Kuan Tsee, who testified for the prosecution, argued that Kalidass was not mentally impaired from the effects of alcohol at the time he killed Usharani, and his post-killing actions of disposing of Usharani's body meticulously also further corroborated that his mental state was normal at the time of the crime. He also added that Kalidass was in a state of hysterical amnesia and malingering, meaning that he deliberately lied that he had no memory of the murder and pretending to be suffering from intoxication by excessive alcohol intake when killing Usharani.

== Verdict and aftermath ==
On 27 March 1980, after hearing the case for nine days, the trial judges Choor Singh and T. S. Sinnathuray rejected Kalidass's defence of alcohol intoxication, and ruled that there was sufficient evidence to prove that Kalidass had intended to strangle the victim after molesting her and that he was fully aware of the magnitude of his actions and offences committed. Therefore, the judges found 26-year-old Kalidass Sinnathamby Narayanasamy guilty of murder and he was sentenced to death. Reportedly, Kalidass thanked the court for sentencing him to death. This was one of the last cases presided by Justice Singh, who retired from the Bench on 30 November of that same year, and the former Solicitor-General Abdul Wahab Ghows was appointed as his successor.

On 17 May 1982, Kalidass's appeal against his sentence failed, with the three judges - Justice T. Kulasekaram, Justice Lai Kew Chai, and Chief Justice Wee Chong Jin - upholding the trial verdict and agreeing that Kalidass was indeed guilty of murder by law. Afterwards, Kalidass was hanged sometime between May 1982 and April 1985, as from the publicly released list of death row inmates who remained alive in April 1985, which had a total of sixteen names (among them include Adrian Lim of the Toa Payoh ritual murders), Kalidass was not one of these inmates remaining alive.

In the aftermath, the Usharani Ganaison case became a case study inside the 1990 book Diminished Responsibility: With Special Reference to Singapore, co-authored by Kok Lee Peng, Molly Cheang and Chee Kuan Tsee. It was also cited among the cases relating to the defence of diminished responsibility in law journals. It was also included among the cases debated by psychiatrists in 1983 about the defence of substance intoxication and diminished responsibility when facing a murder charge, in light of the 1983 trial ruling of the Adrian Lim murders, where the defendants were sentenced to death for two child murders and executed in November 1988 despite their defences of diminished responsibility.

== See also ==
- Murder of Cheng Geok Ha
- Murder of Nonoi
- Murder of Huang Na
- Death of Lim Shiow Rong
- Death of Winnifred Teo
- Capital punishment in Singapore
- List of solved missing person cases: 1950–1999
