= Murder of Cheng Geok Ha =

1977 case of missing girl found raped and murdered in Singapore

Cheng Geok Ha
- Cheng Geok Ha
- Born: Cheng Geok Ha; 1967; Singapore
- Died: 25 November 1977 (aged 10); Chai Chee, Singapore
- Cause of death: Murdered by strangulation
- Resting place: A cemetery in Singapore
- Other name: Mei Mei
- Education: Primary Three at Opera Estate School (incomplete due to her death)
- Occupation: Student
- Known for: Murder victim

On the morning of 25 November 1977, ten-year-old schoolgirl Cheng Geok Ha (Chinese: 钟玉霞; pinyin: Zhōng Yùxiá; c. 1967 – 25 November 1977) was last seen playing with her two friends at the carpark below her flat at Chai Chee, Singapore. According to the pair who were last with Cheng, the girl hung out with them at the playground for a while before she left, and she never came back home that night. The Cheng family reported Cheng missing, and there was a public appeal which sought information to trace her whereabouts.

Nearly two weeks later, on 7 December 1977, Cheng's dead body was found abandoned under a manhole, with her decomposing body stuffed inside a gunny sack. The cause of Cheng's death was strangulation, and the girl was found to be sexually assaulted prior to her death. The police soon arrested the Cheng family's neighbour Quek Kee Siong (郭祺祥 Guō Qíxiáng), a 41-year-old labourer who confessed to the crime but claimed he killed Cheng accidentally. Eventually, the courts ruled that Quek had intentionally killed Cheng based on the severe nature of the girl's injuries and sentenced Quek to death for murder.

== Disappearance of Cheng ==
Cheng Geok Ha, the youngest of twelve children in her family, was born in 1967 to her parents Cheng Hung Kay (or Cheng Ham Kay; 钟汉庚 Zhōng Hàngēng) and Sin Boon Tay (沈春茶 Shěn Chūnchá), who had seven sons and four daughters before Geok Ha's birth. Cheng, a ten-year-old Primary Three student at Opera Estate School, was said to be a bright and independent child who did well academically. She was doted upon by her family members, who affectionately called her "Mei Mei".

On 25 November 1977, after helping her father with an errand, ten-year-old Cheng went downstairs to return a bicycle she borrowed from her neighbour, Khayan Jasim. She played together with Khayan and Khayan's sister at the carpark below her flat before all three of them went to the nearby playground to continue playing. Afterwards, Cheng told the siblings that she was leaving for somewhere else and bid them good-bye. That was the last time Cheng was seen alive, as she failed to return home that night.

Cheng's family, who spent the whole night searching for Cheng, reported her missing 24 hours after her disappearance. Five days later, Cheng's father contacted the newspapers to post a missing person poster, seeking the assistance of members of the public to look for Cheng.

Soon after, Cheng's mother received a phone call from a man, who claimed that he had her daughter held captive, and he asked to meet up at a coffee shop in Serangoon Gardens at noon, but the man did not show up despite Cheng's mother showing up. The mysterious caller made another phone call, asking to meet the Chengs' second-eldest daughter at a theater in Geylang and wanted the daughter to wear white, and if she did so, Cheng would return home. However, Cheng's second sister was too afraid and did not go to the meeting as scheduled. Cheng's family later received several phone calls from other people, but most of them were just prank calls or nuisance calls.

== Murder investigation ==
On 7 December 1977, two weeks after Cheng Geok Ha went missing, a group of teenagers playing sepak raga nearby discovered a gunny sack hidden below a manhole at the void deck of Cheng's flat. Inside the gunny sack was Cheng's decomposing body and a rusty chopper. The police were contacted and they arrived at the scene, where a large crowd of nearby residents had gathered. Ten minutes after the police's arrival, Cheng's father identified his daughter's body based on the clothes she wore prior to her disappearance.

Later, Chao Tzee Cheng, a renowned forensic pathologist, conducted a post-mortem examination of the victim, and found injuries around Cheng's neck and rib fractures from the first to eighth ribs. Chao determined that Cheng had died from asphyxia due to strangulation, and that she had been dead for an estimated period of between ten and 14 days at the time her body was found. Chao also concluded that the girl was sexually assaulted before her death, based on the bruises and swelling on her vulva.

Cheng's disappearance and murder occurred less than a month after the death of Usharani Ganaison, who was seven years old when she was similarly killed after being molested by her assailant, and both girls' cases, though unrelated, were extensively reported back in the year 1977 and shook the public. Later, Usharani's uncle, army lance corporal Kalidass Sinnathamby Narayanasamy, who was an army lance corporal, was arrested and later sentenced to death for her murder in March 1980.

The police questioned the neighbours of Cheng's family one by one. Later, the police arrested one of the neighbours, a 41-year-old labourer named Quek Kee Siong. Quek subsequently confessed to strangling Cheng on the night she went missing. Prior to the crime, Quek was a friend of Cheng's father for twenty years, and they lived in the same kampong before both families relocated to their respective HDB flats in Chai Chee, and they had maintained contact. One of Quek's three children - a son - went to the same school as Cheng.

After his arrest, on 8 December 1977, Quek was charged with murder at the Subordinate Courts. After some pre-trial hearings by the district court, the case was transferred to the High Court in April 1978 for trial hearing on a later date.

== Trial of Quek Kee Siong ==
=== Cases of the prosecution and defence ===
On 27 February 1979, Quek Kee Siong first stood trial in the High Court for the murder of Cheng Geok Ha. The prosecution was led by Fong Kwok Jen, while Quek was represented by defence lawyer Ching Chiak Yong. The case was heard by two judges, T. S. Sinnathuray and T. Kulasekaram, of the High Court.

The prosecution began to present their case, in which they argued that Quek had intentionally strangled Cheng after sexually assaulting her. The prosecution's evidence also showed that Quek was the same mysterious caller who made the two phone calls to harass Cheng's family. In both conversations, the caller had addressed Cheng by her nickname "Mei Mei", which was the nickname that only Cheng's family and their closest acquaintances would use to address Cheng, and the phone calls were traced back to Quek's home telephone. At Quek's flat, the police also found a pawn ticket, which showed Quek pawning a pair of gold earrings for S$8. These earrings were confirmed to be Cheng's, and the earrings were not found on her at the time her body was found. A pair of scissors was also seized from Quek's home and they were matched to the marks made on the earrings, which were retrieved by the police from the pawn shop. It was also revealed in court that Quek tried to matchmake his younger brother with one of Cheng's father's daughters but his request was denied.

Lim Soon Heng (林顺兴 Lín Shùnxīng), a 13-year-old neighbour of Quek, came to court to testify that Quek asked him to buy a gunny sack for him to catch a stray cat. Quek stated that he wanted to use the cat's teeth to save someone's life, and he had hanged the cat to extract the teeth before bringing it home, supposedly to "save someone's life," as Quek told Lim. When he was presented with the gunny sack that Quek used to contain Cheng's body, Lim identified it as the same gunny sack that he bought for Quek.

In his defence, Quek claimed he killed Cheng by accident and he only intended to rape her. He stated that he asked Cheng to come to his flat after encountering the girl alone outdoors, telling her he wanted to show her something nice. Quek recounted that after Cheng entered his home, he observed Cheng playing with his son's toys for a while, before he ambushed the girl, covered her mouth and pinned her down to rape her. Quek stated he used his hand to hold the struggling Cheng down by the neck as he proceeded to sexually assault the girl. It was only later when Quek noticed that Cheng had become motionless. Upon the ten-year-old girl's death, Quek used Lim's newly bought gunny sack to contain Cheng's body and threw it down the rubbish chute. He even went downstairs to remove the gunny sack from the rubbish chute and hid it underneath the manhole. He also claimed at one point that his statements to the police were made involuntarily and that he was abused by his two interrogators - Inspector Leong Kong Hong and Sergeant Wee Chiang Chwee - who forced him to make the incriminating statements.

However, the pathologist, Chao Tzee Cheng, had earlier presented his autopsy report and gave evidence which refuted the account of Quek killing Cheng accidentally. Chao stated that based on the extensive fractures on the neck and ribs, it could only be inferred that the girl was being strangled by Quek for a prolonged period of time, and a huge amount of force and pressure was exerted during the strangulation. It could only mean that Quek had intentionally strangled Cheng and it was unlikely to be an accident.

Aside from the inconsistent accounts Quek made about the case, there was also evidence that Quek used the money he'd gotten from pawning Cheng's earrings to watch a movie despite his claims that he did not know why he pawned the earrings. The allegations that Quek was abused by his interrogators and forced to make his statements were subsequently dismissed by the judges. The prosecution argued in rebuttal that it was inferentially clear that Quek had killed Cheng in order to cover up the rape and avoid leaving Cheng as a witness. As such, they sought a guilty verdict of murder from the High Court.

=== Death penalty ===
Quek Kee Siong, who was found guilty of murdering Cheng Geok Ha and sentenced to death

On 6 March 1979, after a seven-day trial, the judges, Justice T. Kulasekaram and Justice T. S. Sinnathuray, reached and presented their final verdict.

In their final verdict, the two judges rejected the defence's arguments that Quek accidentally killed Cheng, and they agreed that Quek had intentionally strangled Cheng to cause her death, or at least a fatal injury that could in the ordinary cause of nature lead to death. Justice Kulasekaram, who read the verdict, stated that both judges agreed with the prosecution that based on the forensic evidence given by Chao, it could be inferred that Quek did not apply light pressure to the neck as he claimed or that he accidentally suffocated the victim. With reference to the prosecution's arguments, the judges were satisfied that Quek's actions came in line with the requirements of Section 300 of the Penal Code, and therefore fit the legal description of murder as an offence under the law.

As such, 43-year-old Quek Kee Siong was found guilty of murder. Upon his conviction, Quek was sentenced to death under Section 302 of the Penal Code, which then dictated the death penalty as the mandatory sentence for murder in Singapore. Quek was reportedly emotionless as he heard the sentence and he stared at Cheng's parents for a moment while he was led away from the courtroom by police officers.

Quek later filed an appeal to overturn the death sentence, but on 17 November 1980, Quek's appeal was rejected by the Court of Appeal. Chief Justice Wee Chong Jin, who heard the case together with two other judges, Choor Singh and A. P. Rajah, cited that this was one of the "clearest cases" of murder based on the medical evidence presented. They agreed with the High Court that Quek did not kill Cheng accidentally, and rejected his defence.

After the loss of his appeal, Quek Kee Siong was hanged at Changi Prison for the murder of Cheng Geok Ha, as confirmed by a crime documentary. However, his execution date remains unspecified.

== Aftermath ==
In January 1978, the murder of Cheng Geok Ha was reported as one of the top ten most shocking events covered by the media in the year 1977. The case of Cheng's murder was also listed in 1987 as one of the most horrific murder cases involving the disposal of bodies using gunny sacks.

In 1980, there were 27 police officers commended and awarded for their spectacular performance in cracking major cases (including a major armed robbery case). One of them, Sergeant Wee Chiang Chwee, who was one of the officers in charge of the investigation of Cheng's murder, was commended and credited for his dedication to investigate and solve the case, which allowed Quek to be prosecuted and hanged for his crime.

Since the trial and execution of Quek Kee Siong, Cheng's family members, especially her parents, continued to struggle with their heartbreak over the loss of Cheng. According to Cheng's fourth sister Cheng Siok Ngee (钟淑圆 Zhōng Shūyuán; born in 1956), the death of her youngest sister took an emotional toll on her mother Sin Boon Tay's health, and around 15 years after Cheng's death, Cheng's mother died. It was also revealed that after Cheng's death, Cheng's parents bore another child, who became their 13th and final child overall.

In 2005, Singaporean documentary series Missing, which mainly covered Singapore's most bizarre missing person cases over the past decades, re-enacted the case of Cheng's disappearance and murder. The show's producers also interviewed Cheng's fourth-eldest sister Cheng Siok Ngee. Aside from her sadness over her sister's death, Cheng Siok Ngee stated that during the first few years, she at first hated Quek and could not forgive him for having murdered her sister. Cheng's sister added that over the recent years, she devoted herself to Buddhism and eventually came to forgive Quek and not hate him anymore, since he was no longer alive. Part of her reason to forgive Quek was due to her sympathy towards Quek's three children, who endured a lot of hardships due to their late father's crime.

== See also ==
- Murder of Huang Na
- Murder of Nonoi
- Murder of Usharani Ganaison
- Capital punishment in Singapore
- List of major crimes in Singapore
- List of solved missing person cases
