= Pusara Aman Muslim Cemetery =

Islamic cemetery in Singapore

Pusara Aman Muslim Cemetery Tanah Perkuburan Pusara Aman (مقبرة بوسارا أمان الإسلامية)

- Location in Singapore

Religion
- Affiliation: Sunni Islam
- Religious features: See below

Location
- Location: Choa Chu Kang Cemetery, West Region, Singapore
- Country: Singapore
- Coordinates: 1.372521°N 103.694538°E

Architecture
- Type: Islamic cemetery
- Founder: National Environment Agency of Singapore
- Completed: 1973

The Pusara Aman Muslim Cemetery, alternatively known as just Pusara Aman, is an Islamic cemetery located within the wider Choa Chu Kang Cemetery complex in Singapore. Opened in 1973, it is the only active Islamic cemetery in the country.

== History ==
The Pusara Aman Muslim Cemetery was established within the complex of the Choa Chu Kang Cemetery in the 1970s and officially opened for public usage in 1973 by the National Environment Agency (NEA), serving as a replacement for the Muslim sector of the Bidadari Cemetery which had reached its capacity at the time. It was not the first Islamic burial ground to be established in the area, however, as it had been predated by an earlier graveyard along Old Choa Chu Kang Road which had been in existence since 1947. A congregational mosque at the entrance of the cemetery, Masjid Pusara Aman, was also built in 1973 with permission from the NEA. Management of the mosque was given to the Majlis Ugama Islam Singapura (MUIS), while the ownership of the cemetery belonged to the government through the NEA.

In 1973, all Muslim burials were redirected to the Pusara Aman Muslim Cemetery under orders from the NEA. Islamic cemeteries outside of Choa Chu Kang such as Kubur Kassim, Keramat Bukit Kasita and the Jalan Kubor Cemetery were closed for burials, although visitation was still permitted. Most of these outsiders were also exhumed to be reinterred in Pusara Abadi and Pusara Aman, while some others were kept intact as reserve sites that would make way for future redevelopment works in their respective areas.

In 1995, the Pusara Aman Muslim Cemetery was expanded for the first time, after the site had reached a maximum capacity of 45,000 burials. Then in 1998, the NEA introduced a policy stating that burials within the cemetery had a fifteen year lease period, before the graves would be exhumed and the remains reinterred in a crypt-like grave at another part of the cemetery in order to make space for newer burials. Following this policy, more than 10,000 graves in the Pusara Aman Muslim Cemetery were slated for exhumation in 2007, reinterred at the nearby Pusara Abadi compound, also within the Choa Chu Kang Cemetery.

== Amenities ==
Masjid Pusara Aman is the only congregational mosque serving both the Pusara Aman and Pusara Abadi cemeteries within the Choa Chu Kang Cemetery. It also serves as a funeral parlour, with a room inside that is dedicated for the washing and shrouding of corpses. In the northwestern corner of the mosque is a zinc-roofed shelter that contains a cafe and canteen for congregants. A second funeral parlour operated by the NEA can be found along Jalan Bahar, just outside the second street of the cemetery.

== Notable burials ==
- Zubir Said (1907–1987), the composer of the national anthem of Singapore.
- Othman Wok (1924–2017), Singaporean diplomat and politician.
- Syed Isa Semait (1938–2025), former mufti of Singapore.

== See also ==
- Muslim cemeteries in Singapore
