= Muslim cemeteries in Singapore =

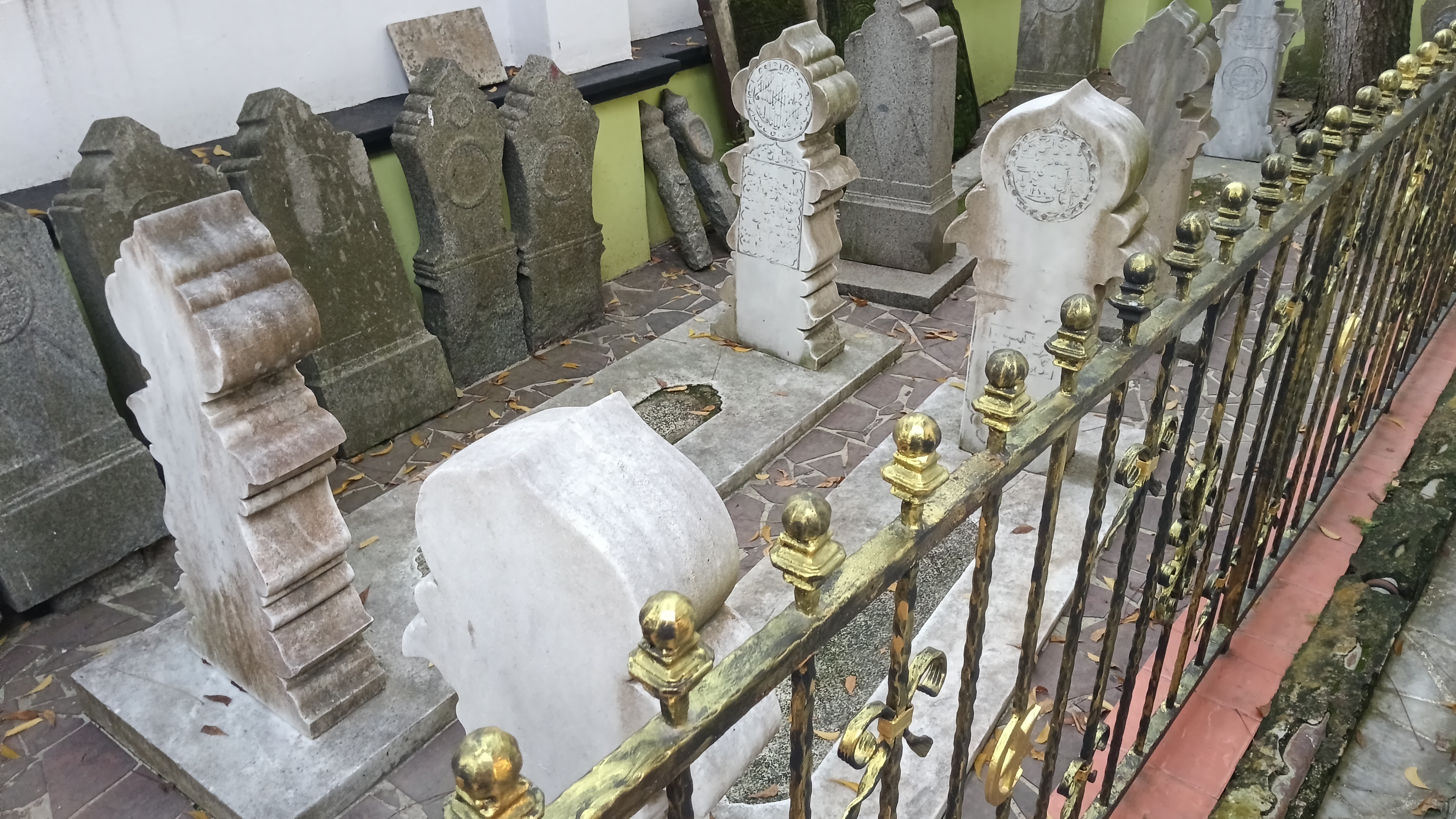
Islamic graves and preserved tombstones situated in a compound along Keng Cheow Street off Havelock Road.

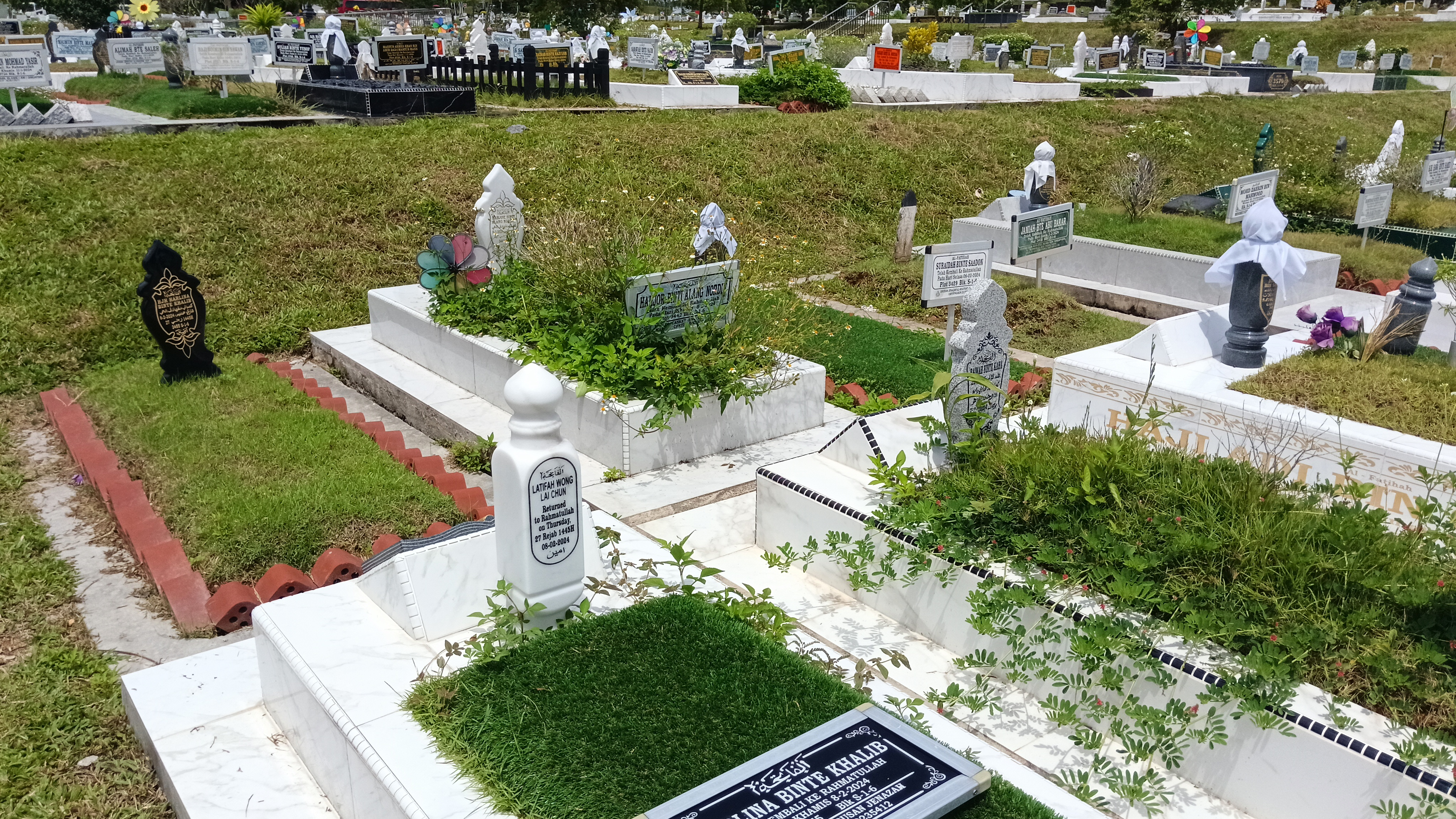
Islamic graves in the Choa Chu Kang Cemetery.

Muslim cemeteries in Singapore have existed throughout the country for as long as even before the colonial period. The only active Muslim cemeteries are within the Islamic sector of the larger Choa Chu Kang Cemetery. Other cemeteries have been disused and are either still extant or relocated to the Pusara Abadi Muslim Cemetery.

== Active ==
=== Pusara Aman Muslim Cemetery ===
The cemetery of Pusara Aman was opened on 14 January 1974 to replace the Bidadari Cemetery that had reached its maximum capacity. It is served by Masjid Pusara Aman, the main mosque of the cemetery and a funeral parlour. In 2007, the boundaries of the cemetery had to be reshaped, and so at least ten thousand graves were exhumed and reinterred in a central location within the cemetery.

=== Pusara Abadi Muslim Cemetery ===
The Pusara Abadi was originally opened as a cemetery for the reinterments of graves that had been exhumed to make way for redevelopments. As of 2021, the cemetery is still active for fresh burials that are not reinterments.

== Extant ==
=== Jalan Kubor Cemetery ===
The Jalan Kubor Cemetery is a complex of three Islamic burial grounds; the first being a royal cemetery for relatives of the Sultan of Johor, the second being a commoners cemetery and the third being an Indian Muslim burial ground known as the Tittacheri Muslim Cemetery. The Malabar Mosque, built in 1963, stands at the edge of the Tittacheri Muslim Cemetery and serves visitors of the burial ground. The final burial in the area was of the Muslim merchant Ambo Sooloh in 1963, whose grave is now situated within the grounds of the Malabar Mosque. The cemetery is renowned for its various tombstones with different styles and from different periods of time, with varying inscriptions written in English, Arabic, Malay and Chinese languages, indicating the multicultural background of Kampong Glam.

=== Kubur Kassim ===
Kubur Kassim is an Islamic cemetery opened in the 1920s and named after its founder, Ahna Mohamed Kassim. The cemetery is subject to legends and mythology by locals, including the claim that some graves in the plot belong to the mythical orang bunian. There is also a run-down surau in the middle of the cemetery that is annexed to the mausoleum of an Islamic scholar, Khwaja Habibullah Shah. Keramat shrines are prevalent in the cemetery, including the grave of Habib Ali bin Abi Bakr, a former Sufi mystic and sage.

=== Beach Road Cemetery ===
This cemetery is a private burial ground situated within the grounds of Hajjah Fatimah Mosque at Beach Road. It was established for the family of Hajjah Fatimah binti Sulaiman and her grandson, Nong Chik. This cemetery was closed for burials in 1973, although it is still open for visitation.

=== Keramat Bukit Kasita ===
Keramat Bukit Kasita is a cemetery-shrine which was established by the Sultanate of Johor in 1530. In the present day, it is situated in the midst of the Bukit Purmei housing estate. A ruined mosque stands at the entrance of the cemetery, serving as a place of refuge for the caretaker.

=== Marang Road Cemetery ===
The Marang Road Cemetery is a defunct cemetery located on the foothills of Mount Faber, next to the similarly named Marang Trail. It served the village of Kampong Marang that was founded in the 1920s by immigrants from Marang, Terengganu, hence the name. Notable burials include that of Abdul Hamid Marang, a co-founder and the namesake of Masjid Abdul Hamid, a mosque built in 1932 on the site of a former cattle pen.

=== Kubur Boyan ===
A former cemetery for Bawaenese Muslims, the Kubur Boyan, exists at the edge of the Lucky Gardens housing estate, between Parbury Avenue and Bedok South Block 70. The cemetery was a waqf from a Muslim woman named Nyaii, hence its alternate name Tanah Wakaf Nyaii (Malay language for Waqf Land of Nyaii).

=== Kubur Wak Selat ===
Formerly a cemetery for a local village, Kampong Wak Selat, it was later abandoned after the aforementioned village had been torn down in 1993 for the construction of industrial workhouses in Kranji. Despite its abandonment, the cemetery is still visible amongst the bushes behind the bus stop of Block 2 along Kranji Road. It is still well-cared for by former residents of Kampong Wak Selat, with some graves in the cemetery having renovations after the 2010s.

== Disappeared ==
=== Bidadari Cemetery ===
The Muslim portion of the Bidadari Cemetery was opened in 1910, accepting burials until 1971. Between 2001 and 2006, a total of sixty-eight thousand Muslim graves were exhumed in order to make way for the construction of the Bidadari housing estate and its adjoining rail station, the Woodleigh MRT station on the North–East Line. Notable former burials in the cemetery include that of politicians Ahmad bin Ibrahim and Baharuddin Ariff.

=== Kampong Glam ===
A private cemetery dedicated to Fakeh Haji Abdul Jalil, a former head cleric of the nearby Sultan Mosque, was exhumed to make way for the construction of the Golden Landmark Shopping Complex in 1983. This cemetery was once revered as a keramat and was prominently visited during the Second World War, managed by the descendants of Haji Abdul Jalil who practiced consanguinity in order to keep their bloodline considered "saintly" to validate their role as guardians of the cemetery.

=== Kallang and Geylang ===
A small, private cemetery named Keramat Kallang was once present along the banks of the Kallang River, intended as the burial place of an Iraqi trader named Siti Maryam and her relatives. The cemetery was exhumed in 2009 and the remains were relocated to the Pusara Abadi Muslim Cemetery. The ruins of a former Islamic cemetery are also present next to the former gateway of the Kallang Airport.

Nearby, a cemetery situated within Masjid Khadijah located along Geylang Road was cleared in 1997. Then in 2000, a private cemetery in Masjid Wak Tanjong belonging to the founder of the mosque and his relatives was cleared out and reinterred at the Pusara Abadi cemetery.

=== Chinatown ===
Within the compound of Masjid Jamae along South Bridge Road in Chinatown existed a cemetery for the local Muslim residents. This burial ground does not exist anymore, with the exception of the mausoleum of Muhammad Salih Waliullah that is commonly visited by locals and tourists for the purpose of ziyarat.

=== Bedok ===
A large Muslim cemetery in the Siglap portion of Bedok was exhumed in the 1990s to make way for development of the modern Siglap neighbourhood. The only remnants of the cemetery are three tombs belonging to the founder of Siglap, Tok Lasam, and his wife and trusted lieutenant, which were not exhumed and instead preserved at the site, as well as two unnamed tombstones behind the Siglap Court private apartment building. Tok Lassam's grave is an unofficial heritage site amongst former residents of the Kampong Siglap village that once stood in the area.
