= Pusara Abadi Muslim Cemetery =

Islamic cemetery in Singapore

Pusara Aman Muslim Cemetery Tanah Perkuburan Pusara Abadi (مقبرة بوسارا أمان الإسلامية)
- Signage at the entrance of the cemetery.

- Location in Singapore

Religion
- Affiliation: Sunni Islam
- Religious features: See below

Location
- Location: Choa Chu Kang Cemetery, West Region, Singapore
- Country: Singapore
- Coordinates: 1.3697343°N 103.6929821°E

Architecture
- Type: Islamic cemetery
- Completed: c. 1947

The Pusara Abadi Muslim Cemetery, also simply known as Pusara Abadi, is an Islamic cemetery located within the Choa Chu Kang Cemetery in Singapore. Although predating the nearby Pusara Aman Muslim Cemetery, it consists mostly of reinterments. Notable figures buried in the cemetery include former politician Ahmad bin Ibrahim (1927–1962) and Wak Tanjong, founder of Masjid Wak Tanjong.

== History ==
The Pusara Abadi Muslim Cemetery was established and opened at an unknown date before 1974, predating the establishment of the newer Pusara Aman cemetery in 1973. Originally a separate, independent burial ground, the cemetery was later regarded as an extension of Pusara Aman by 1995. Regardless, both cemeteries were placed under the management of the National Environment Agency (NEA) with the religious advisories given from the Majlis Ugama Islam Singapura (MUIS). In the late 1990s, Pusara Abadi received 77,000 new reinterments that were exhumed from the Bidadari Cemetery which had been cleared in order to make way for the modern Bidadari housing estate. Then in 1998, both the Pusara Abadi and Pusara Aman cemeteries were issued a fifteen year lease period, with the graves in both cemeteries to be exhumed and reinterred in separate crypt-like graves for multiple remains once the lease had expired.

The line between both cemeteries would be further blurred in 2007, when at least 10,000 graves from Pusara Aman were selected for exhumation and reinterment in Pusara Abadi after their lease period had officially expired. By 2012, the cemetery became notable for being composed primarily of reinterments, which included former keramats and graves that were exhumed from the islands of Singapore. It was also where a secondary stage of the funeral of Othman Wok was held in 2017 before he was eventually buried at Pusara Aman. In the late 2010s, Illegal flower merchants and street peddlers frequented the grounds of the cemetery to sell their goods until August 2020 when both the NEA and the Singapore Food Agency clamped down firmly on such activities.

== Amenities ==
All Islamic cemeteries within the Choa Chu Kang Cemetery are served by Masjid Pusara Aman, a congregational mosque that also functions as a funeral parlour. An old surau can be found at the entrance of the Pusara Abadi Muslim Cemetery, but it is generally disused and is not in the registry of the MUIS. A bus stop is also located outside the cemetery, along Muslim Cemetery Path 7.

== Prominent burials ==
- Norasharee Gous (1973–2022) former drug trafficker who was executed by hanging.
- Shaiful Samshul Bahri (1982–2021), a Major of the Singapore Armed Forces.

=== Reinterments ===
- Ahmad bin Ibrahim, a local politician and former Minister for Labour, was originally buried at the Bidadari Cemetery before being reinterred at the Pusara Abadi Muslim Cemetery in the 1990s.
- Wak Tanjong, the founder of Masjid Wak Tanjong was originally buried in a compound behind his mosque until his tomb was relocated to the cemetery after 2001.
- Oli Chivli Kutti Mamoo, a pharmacist, was reinterred in the cemetery in a single grave alongside a female relative of his and an Arab Muslim sage named Syed Mustafa al-Aydarus in 1979. Both Mamoo and al-Aydarus had been buried together at a mausoleum in Chai Chee, known as the keramat of "Bismillah Wali."
- Siti Maryam, a merchant from Baghdad, was originally entombed at the keramat of her family along the Kallang River before it was demolished in 2010. She was reinterred in a single grave in the cemetery.
- Fakeh Haji Abdul Jalil, a former cleric at the Sultan Mosque of Kampong Glam. His private mausoleum was exhumed at an unknown point of time before 1990.

== See also ==
- Muslim cemeteries in Singapore
