= Murder of Nonoi =

2006 high-profile child rape and murder case in Singapore

Nonoi
- Born: Nurasyura binte Mohamed Fauzi; 2 May 2003; Singapore
- Died: 1 March 2006 (aged 2); Block 90, Pipit Road, Singapore
- Resting place: Pusara Abadi Muslim Cemetery, Lim Chu Kang; 1°27'06.2"N 103°49'14.8"E
- Other name: Nur Asyura binte Mohamed Fauzi (alternative spelling of the birth name)
- Known for: Murder victim

Nurasyura binte Mohamed Fauzi was a two-year-old Malay girl from Singapore who was raped and murdered. Nurasyura, better known as Nonoi, had gone missing on 1 March 2006, and a highly publicized search ensued; three days later her stepfather, Mohammed Ali bin Johari, confessed to what he claimed was an accidental death, and he led police to her body. An autopsy revealed that the girl was drowned and sexually assaulted before her death. On 31 August 2007, after an 8-day hearing, the High Court found Mohammed Ali, who repeatedly denied raping Nonoi, guilty of murder and sentenced him to death.

Subsequently, the Court of Appeal of Singapore, while dismissing Mohammed Ali's appeal on 22 April 2008, had also found him guilty of raping Nonoi even though the prosecution had not formally made an additional charge of rape against him in the first place. After staying on death row for another 8 months since the loss of his appeal, Mohammed Ali was hanged on 19 December 2008. The case had been a shock to Singaporeans since its occurrence and aftermath, spawning a 2009 TV adaptation of the case and a publication of the case by Singapore's national newspaper The Straits Times in 2015.

== Disappearance ==
=== Search for Nonoi ===
On the Wednesday evening of 1 March 2006, at a ground floor, 3-room unit at Block 62, Circuit Road, two-year-old Nurasyura binte Mohamed Fauzi, affectionately known as "Nonoi", went missing. A search was conducted by her family and relatives; the neighbours, police, and some strangers joined in the search and distributed flyers. The search was widely reported in the newspapers, with the police making an appeal to the public for any information about the girl's whereabouts. Her step-grandfather, 59-year-old Johari bin Mohammed Yus, the owner of the Circuit Road flat, had last seen her at around 7 pm before he began his evening prayers; he was also the one who reported her missing.

=== Confession and arrest ===
Three days later, on 4 March, at his Pipit Road flat and Nonoi's home, 29-year-old Mohammed Ali bin Johari, the girl's stepfather, suddenly broke down and tearfully confessed to his wife - Mdm Mastura binte Kamsir (aged 22) - and his elderly mother-in-law - Rozanah binte Salleh - that it was his fault and asked for forgiveness. He said to them in Malay, "Nonoi, dah tak ada" (meaning "Nonoi, no more"). Much to the shock, anger and grief of the women, Mohammed Ali admitted that Nonoi was dead and that he had no intention to kill her. According to Mdm Rozanah, upon hearing her son-in-law's confession, she suspected that her son-in-law must have done something bad to her granddaughter. Upon further questioning, Mohammed Ali said that he had immersed Nonoi inside a pail of water and this caused her to die, but maintained that he did not intend to cause her death and told the women that he will inform the police about this.

After he turned himself in at Bedok Police Station, Mohammed Ali then led the police to the Aljunied Flyover along the Pan Island Expressway, where the partially decomposed and naked body of a female toddler with shoulder-length hair was found at the lowest portion of the flyover. DNA tests were conducted and it was certified that the body belonged to the missing Nonoi. As Mohammed Ali was brought away by police, several enraged neighbours and strangers shouted expletives at him.

=== Indictment and remand ===
On 7 March 2006, three days after his arrest, 29-year-old Mohammed Ali was charged with murder. Neither side of the family spoke to the media. Before Nonoi's murder, the families of her mother and stepfather were close, brought together by Nonoi.

After he was charged, on 13 March, Mohammed Ali was ordered to be remanded at Changi Prison Complex Medical Centre for psychiatric evaluation. Three weeks later, on 3 April, Mohammed Ali was ordered to be further remanded for three more weeks for more psychiatric assessments.

=== Cause of death ===
After the police retrieved Nonoi's body, consultant forensic pathologist and Associate Professor Dr. Gilbert Lau of the Centre for Forensic Medicine (Health Sciences Authority) conducted a post-mortem examination of the corpse on 5 March 2006. In his autopsy report, Dr. Lau wrote that the examination of the external genitalia showed "extensive laceration of the fourchette, associated with apparent obliteration of the hymen and localised, acute haemorrhage," external injuries consistent with sexual assault. The tests for any semen or DNA around the vaginal area of the deceased were negative.

Dr. Lau also found that the lungs of the child were full of water and over-expanded, consistent with being drowned or immersed in water. However, despite his findings, Dr. Lau was unable to fully ascertain the true cause of death. He testified in court that the sexual injuries were not sufficient in the ordinary cause of nature to cause death. He wrote that the most possible reason behind Nonoi's death was due to her being immersed or drowned in water while adding in two alternative causes of death - a seizure or abnormal heart rhythm, though Dr. Lau said Nonoi's death was probably not part of a natural process.

=== Burial ===
On 8 March 2006, Nonoi was buried at Pusara Abadi Muslim Cemetery, after a brief funeral held by her family at Pusara Aman Mosque. It was reported at that time that Nonoi's mother could not leave her after her burial and Nonoi's paternal grandmother fainted in the middle of the funeral. Mohamed Fauzi bin Abdul Kadil, Nonoi's father and Mdm Mastura's first husband before her marriage to Mohammed Ali, was present at the funeral. There were 200 people attending Nonoi's funeral, including the brothers of Nonoi's stepfather.

== Background ==
=== Mohammed Ali bin Johari (Nonoi's stepfather) ===
Mohammed Ali bin Johari

Born to Johari bin Mohammed Yus and Fatimah binte Yusoff, Mohammed Ali grew up together with a few siblings in his family. Mohammed Ali was reported to be a drug addict who abused marijuana and cough syrup and others; this habit continued until his arrest on 4 March 2006. At the time of his arrest, Mohammed Ali was working as a freelance dispatch driver. Mohammed Ali was married when he was 16 years old and had three children. He first met Mdm Mastura in 2005 and got her pregnant in that same year, leading to his divorce with his first wife and she gained custody of all their three children. According to his ex-wife, Mohammed Ali was a "jealous husband" and "impatient man" with a quick temper. Mohammed Ali and Mastura married, after she similarly divorced her first husband Mohamed Fauzi bin Abdul Kadil.

In the divorce proceedings with her first husband, Mastura gained custody of Nonoi, who was one of Mastura's three children from her first marriage, while the other two children, a son and another daughter went to live with their father. Effectively, Nonoi became Mohammed Ali's stepdaughter. After the marriage between Mohammed Ali and Mastura, the couple had another son. The family of four resided in a one-room flat in Pipit Road. During his time of marriage, Mohammed Ali maintained a close relationship with his parents and unmarried siblings (who lived together with their parents).

=== Mastura binte Kamsir (Nonoi's mother) ===
Born in 1984, Mastura was the daughter of Rozanah binte Salleh and an unnamed father. Mastura dropped out of school at age 14, and two years later, in 2000, at age 16, she was pregnant and married to Mohamed Fauzi bin Abdul Kadil. Her first two children, a son and daughter, were both born in the same year she married Mohamed Fauzi.

At age 19, Mastura was charged in court with an unknown offence and was subsequently sentenced to imprisonment. During the period of her incarceration, Mastura, gave birth to her third child, Nonoi, on 2 May 2003. However, during the trial of Mohammed Ali, DNA tests revealed that Nonoi was actually not Mohamed Fauzi's biological daughter. The biological father of Nonoi was actually another Malay man, only named as Khairul, with whom Mdm Mastura had an affair a year prior to her imprisonment.

After her release, Mastura met Mohammed Ali in 2005, and became pregnant with his child. Because of this, Mastura divorced her husband, who took custody of their elder two children, while she had Nonoi. She married Mohammed Ali in November 2005, and they lived with Nonoi and the son they had together. At the time of her daughter's death, Mdm Mastura was working as a traditional masseuse.

== Trial and sentencing ==
=== Trial ===
On 26 January 2007, at a preliminary hearing of the case in the courts of Singapore, the judge presiding it decided that there is enough evidence to prosecute Mohammed Ali for murder. The trial was set to take place the following month, but it did not.

On 4 April 2007, more than a year after he raped and killed Nonoi, 30-year-old Mohammed Ali stood trial in the High Court of Singapore before High Court judge Kan Ting Chiu, who heard the case. The prosecution in charge of prosecuting Mohammed Ali consist of 4 members: Deputy Public Prosecutors Christopher Ong, Tan Wee Soon, Stanley Kok Pin Chin and Vinesh Winodan of the Attorney-General's Chambers. In his trial, Mohammed Ali was represented by two lawyers, R S Bajwa and Sarindar Singh. The 8-day trial, which dragged on for four months from April to August in the year 2007, was reported extensively in Singapore media. Under Singapore law, if Mohammed Ali was found guilty of murder, he would be sentenced to death.

==== Initial account ====
Mohammed Ali, in his police statements prior to his trial (which he also said in his defence), maintained that he did not rape the girl and would never do it as he loved Nonoi like his own flesh and blood, and that he immersed the girl in water with the purpose of merely wanting to stop her from crying (he told the police and court that Nonoi, who was normally a cheerful child, for some reason, kept crying on the day itself and did not stop). Mohammed Ali also argued he did not intend to kill her, and accidentally immersed Nonoi in water for a longer period of time after doing so two times while picking up an incoming phone call. Going further, he said that on the day of the murder itself, he left his children at his parents' flat and went shopping with Mastura as it was her payday. After lunchtime, he sent her to work before returning to his parents' flat (as he was not working on that day). Mohammed Ali told the police that, after a short while, he decided to bring out his stepdaughter for a walk. From that point onwards, he said, Nonoi started to cry. He brought her to a provision shop but she did not want him to buy sweets for her and she wanted to go back to her step-grandparents' flat. He later went to visit a friend who also lived in Circuit Road like his parents, but the friend was not at home, so he went back to his Pipit Road home with Nonoi. When alone at home with Nonoi, she kept crying and she continued so even after he turned on both the television and radio and raised his voice at her several times to keep quiet.

To stop her crying, Mohammed Ali said he slapped her and hit her legs. When it did not work, Mohammed Ali dunked her briefly in a pail half-filled with water head-down once, and when Nonoi continued to cry, he filled the pail to three quarters full with water before doing it a second time. When he did it the third time, Mohammed Ali accidentally done it at a longer time as he went to answer the call, and due to this, Mohammed Ali said that Nonoi became unresponsive. After she died and after he failed to resuscitate her, Mohammed Ali said that he was in a state of panic upon his stepdaughter's death. Later, he quickly dressed Nonoi in dry clothes, brought her to his parents' flat and laid her on a bed, making it so that she was sleeping. He even take precautions and stood by the bedroom door to not allow anyone disturb her and tell everyone to keep quiet; he was afraid, he said, to let anyone know that Nonoi died in his house. There is a front exit and back exit in the Circuit Road flat, which made it easy for people to go in and out. It was only when his elderly father began his evening prayers then he went to dispose the body at Aljunied Flyover. After covering up the body with some trash, Mohammed Ali said to his step-daughter's corpse before leaving, "Nonoi, get up, Nonoi. I leave you here for a while."

After his evening prayers, at around 7.35 pm, Mr Johari, then 59 years old and a retiree, discovered her missing and thought that she wandered off, thus it began the three-day search for her. Mohammed Ali blamed his father for Nonoi's disappearance and even punched one of his brothers, then-22-year-old Mohammed Rahim, for this issue (this was what his brother told the court on the stand). When he was asked about the sexual injuries at her vaginal area, Mohammed Ali said that when on that day, after he dunked Nonoi into the pail, he found that Nonoi urinated in her pampers, so he removed it and scrubbed the genitals of the girl. He said he told Nonoi to do it herself, but she could not do it fast enough so he did it instead. Mohammed Ali claimed that he done it in a hurry and used more strength.

To a police investigative officer questioning him, Mohammed Ali said these words as reported in a news article dated 10 April 2007, "I hit her at legs. I slap her face. I dip her into a pail of water, head-first, which caused her death. I do not have the intention to do all these as I am not a murderer and I am not a rapist. When she has died, I become afraid and I hide her body in a drain. Instead of giving the death sentence, just imprison me. I ask for forgiveness from everyone and also (from) the deceased (Nonoi)."

==== Prosecution's case ====
However, at the beginning of the trial, in their case, the prosecutors who prosecuted Mohammed Ali for the rape and murder of Nonoi, presented a different case. Their case was that Mohammed Ali had raped his stepdaughter, and killed her in order to cover up his crime. To which, Mohammed Ali, who maintained a normal and calm demeanour throughout the trial, vehemently denied it and flared up when the prosecution repeatedly asked him about this. As he lost his cool, Mohammed Ali said in court, "I hope this is the last time that I tell the court that I would not do such things."

The police officers who were in charge of investigating the case, led by Deputy Superintendent of Police (DSP) Ang Bee Chin, also obtained evidence from the phone records of Mohammed Ali from M1 (MoblieOne) for the period between 27 February and 4 March 2006. The phone records, which were presented in court, showed that there were several incoming calls on 3 March (the day before his arrest) but on the day of Nonoi's death, Mohammed Ali did not answer a single call on his mobile phone, which proven his police statement of him answering a call while Nonoi is still immersed in water to be not true. This was one aspect where the prosecution called Mohammed Ali's statement a lie.

Besides, the statements of Mastura and other family members stated they found no injuries on Nonoi when she took a bath; this led to establishments of hallmark signs leading to the possibility that the alleged sexual assault could have taken place sometime later that day, especially when Mohammed Ali was alone at home with his stepdaughter. Mdm Mastura, who testified under oath at her husband's court hearing, said that she earlier discovered an injury on her daughter's arm while bathing her, Mohammed Ali responded to her that Nonoi accidentally touched his motorcycle's hot exhaust pipe and got burnt when she asked him about it. Mr Johari said that there were occasions when his son brought his children Nonoi and Daniel to his home to place under his care, there are times when Mohammed Ali would bring Nonoi alone back home, claiming that he was going to bathe her; these two above testimonies cast doubts over Mohammed Ali's claims that he never abused Nonoi before the day of her death.

==== Mohammed Ali changes his story ====
In the court, however, Mohammed Ali changed his story and recanted parts of it (especially at the part where he claimed he was distracted by the phone call and the third immersion in water). He said that he did hear a ringing sound, but was unsure whether it came from his phone or the radio. He also said that after the third time he dunked her in water, Nonoi grew weak and soft and was blinking her eyes, and she became dead eventually, but he claimed uncertainty over the time of her death if it occurred after he left the Pipit Road flat or when he returned to his parents' Circuit Road flat. Using a dummy and pail, he demonstrated live in court how he dunked his stepdaughter in the eyes of all present in the courtroom to hear the case (he claimed he did the immersions in less than a second). He said that he was not lying, but scared and confused when he gave his statements to the police.

==== Psychiatric evidence ====
Senior consultant psychiatrist G Sathyadevan of the Institute of Mental Health, who was the psychiatrist conducting a psychiatric assessment of Mohammed Ali during the time of his remand, appeared on the second day of the trial (5 April 2007) to testify and present his psychiatric report of Mohammed Ali's mental condition. Not only did Dr Sathyadevan tell the court that Mohammed Ali told him essentially the same account of the case as what he told the police investigators, his psychiatric report painted a dark picture of Mohammed Ali; he was still abusing drugs two days before Nonoi died, having difficulty holding a job, his quick temper and a below-average low IQ of 89. It was also revealed that Mohammed Ali would frequently use Nonoi as a cover to avoid exposure of his drug abuse and thus evade arrest from narcotics enforcement officers (this was also his purpose of bringing Nonoi out alone on the day of the murder). Sathyadevan also said that the above personality flaws of Mohammed Ali should not have made him having to inflict so severe a punishment on his step-daughter that would likely cause her death. He stated that with Mohammed Ali's low IQ, he would have thought of a way to cope with Nonoi's endless series of crying.

==== Other evidence ====
In light of the autopsy report and court testimony by Dr Gilbert Lau regarding the other two alternative causes of death, the prosecution was granted permission to call for two medical witnesses regarding this issue. On 12 April 2007, the fifth day of the trial, the trial was adjourned till a later date after the prosecution sought leave to allow the expert witnesses more time to prepare their evidence.

The trial resumed on 28 August 2007. During the following three days, the two medical witnesses called upon by the prosecution - Dr Edmund Lee Jon Deoon and Dr Foo Chong Wee - arrived in court to give evidence. The court was told that in January 2004, when Nonoi was 8 months old, she was hospitalised at the National University Hospital (NUH), and was diagnosed to be suffering from gastroenteritis-provoked seizures by Dr Foo, who was one of the doctors in charge of her treatment. Dr Foo stated that the secondary diagnosis of Nonoi's medical condition at that point in time had been status epilepticus (one of the alternative causes of death).

Dr Lee, who came from the Pharmacology Department at NUH, had conducted a study of the genetic make-up of the victim on the request of Dr Lau for his assistance, and the results from Dr Lee's study discovered that two genetic variants were speculatively linked to the abnormalities of heart rhythm and that these could confer a risk of cardiac arrhythmia (abnormal heart rhythm) in the presence of an environmental trigger. However, Dr Lee added that it was not proven that these genetic variants are linked to sudden cardiac death, or cardiac arrhythmia could occur in the presence of an environmental trigger. In his words, Dr Lee said, "the results of [the] study into the deceased's genetic makeup have no diagnostic value whatsoever, and any possibility of a link between the genetic variants identified in her genetic makeup and sudden cardiac death is highly speculative."

==== Closing submissions ====
On 30 August 2007, Mohammed Ali's lawyer R S Bajwa submitted that his 30-year-old client was eligible for a defence of "sudden and grave provocation", saying that his dunking of Nonoi in a pail of water was a response to the incessant cries by the girl, which provoked his client. In his closing submissions, Mr Bajwa cited a British murder case in 1986, where a man was provoked into killing his 17-day-old baby due to the infant's non-stop crying and his murder conviction was substituted into one of culpable homicide not amounting to murder (or manslaughter) due to a defence of sudden and grave provocation. The lawyer said that his client's low intelligence, lack of parenting skills and bad temper were factors in favour of such a defence. "Due to the incessant crying, the accused just snapped and decided to punish the deceased to quieten her." said Mr Bajwa. "Due to the fact that he was with her all day and her crying was incessant, he had no opportunity to compose himself - there was no "cooling off" period." Mr Bajwa also said that from a psychiatric perspective, this is a "normal or acceptable reaction of someone with the profile of the accused (Mohammed Ali)."

In his closing submissions however, DPP Christopher Ong, who led the prosecution, described Mohammed Ali as a "cool killer" who took "careful and elaborate steps to conceal his involvement" in his stepdaughter's death. He said that Nonoi, a toddler who was not even three at the time of her death, was sexually assaulted by her stepfather who drowned her in a pail of water in her family home of the flat at Pipit Road. He pointed out that Mohammed Ali had lied to his own family Nonoi was sleeping while awaiting an opportunity to dispose her corpse, and feigned anger at his father and brother for not looking after the girl properly and go physical on his brother. DPP Ong described the situation, in his own words, "It is incredible that the accused (Mohammed Ali) would have been able to maintain this entire charade, were he truly in a state of panic and wracked with guilt over Nonoi's 'accidental' death."

=== Verdict ===
At the end of the trial on 31 August 2007, Justice Kan Ting Chiu delivered his verdict. In his final judgement, Justice Kan said that even though Mohammed Ali's narration of the events were largely similar in his police statements and court testimonies, there is a discrepancy over whether if Mohammed Ali really got distracted and answered a phone call during the third time he immersed Nonoi into water in his court testimony and police statements, and he read out that from the totality of the evidence, there is no phone call as what Mohammed Ali claimed. Justice Kan also do not believe that Mohammed Ali was in a state of panic and shock when his stepdaughter died; in his verdict, the judge said that "By his (Mohammed Ali) own evidence, he did not lose the ability to speak as he spoke to Nonoi and pleaded with her to wake up. Nor was he in such a state that he could not think, as he had attempted to revive her."

The judge further noted this by mentioning the stepfather taking steps to avoid any suspicion regarding Nonoi's death and himself saying a lot of thoughts coming to his mind whether he should call the police. Justice Kan said there is no direct evidence of sexual assault and not only that, the prosecution did not charge Mohammed Ali with this crime and the defendant had made no admission of such, hence this issue would have limited to no bearing on the charge of murder the defendant was standing trial for. Finally, regarding the cause of death, Justice Kan ruled that after evaluating all the evidence, Nonoi died from the effects of the immersions (he felt that there were insufficient evidence to support the two possibilities behind Nonoi's death), and decided that Mohammed Ali had intentionally kept his stepdaughter immersed in water for a long period of time and it was not an accident.

Therefore, Justice Kan was satisfied that the prosecution had proven its case beyond a reasonable doubt and thus, he found 31-year-old Mohammed Ali guilty of murder and sentenced him to death for murdering his stepdaughter. Mohammed Ali was reported to be relatively calm when the sentence was passed but he looked like he was on the verge of tears. His mother was agonized and broke down upon hearing that her son was sentenced to death. His father told his son to calm down, to pray to God to seek forgiveness for his crime and to accept the price for his crime before he was led away by the police. It was confirmed that Mohammed Ali would file an appeal against his sentence and conviction.

== Mohammed Ali's appeal ==
=== Hearing ===
During the appeal hearing in the Court of Appeal of Singapore (the highest court of the land), Mohammed Ali's lawyer R S Bajwa argued that his client had no intention of causing his stepdaughter any bodily injury as the three judges - one High Court judge Tay Yong Kwang and two Judges of Appeal Andrew Phang Boon Leong and V K Rajah - heard the appeal. He said that even if there is, the intended bodily injury — which was to deprive her of air temporarily — was minor. In response to this argument, one of the three judges, Judge of Appeal V K Rajah retorted without mincing his words, "Wouldn't it be apparent to any person that dipping a young child into a pail of water, not once but three times, would cause not just minor but major injuries?" After saying this, Justice Rajah added, "It's the cruelest thing you can do to a young child."

Mr Bajwa also pointed out that the original trial judge Kan Ting Chiu had "side-stepped" the issue of whether Mohammed Ali had molested his stepdaughter, which he argued was critical and an error on the judge's part because the prosecution had built a case that he had sexually abused and then murdered her to avoid exposure of his treachery. Not only did he depended on the two alternative causes of death and the unascertained truth behind Nonoi's death as the case of his client not being the one killed Nonoi, Mr Bajwa also attempt to use the argument of judicial interference to argue that Justice Kan had denied Mohammed Ali the right of a fair trial by repeatedly interrupting during the cross-examination of witnesses and process and directing the prosecution on how to proceed with their case and their evidence to prove their case against Mohammed Ali.

In rebuttal, the prosecution (where DPP Vinesh Winodan remained in the prosecution while his other three colleagues were replaced by solely DPP Lau Wing Yum of the AGC) presented that Mohammed Ali had intended to cause serious injury to Nonoi and there was no evidence of a phone call like what he claimed. They also argued that the objective evidence and statements of Mohammed Ali suggested that the findings were consistent with death by drowning. The purpose of the judge's interruptions was seeking to ascertain the full facts and most of the instances alleged as examples of judicial interference were directed at the technical and forensic aspects of the case. They said that the judge also did it when Mohammed Ali took the stand to put up his defence, which was to assist him in his case and yet Mohammed Ali did not cite this as judicial interference.

=== Dismissal ===
On 22 April 2008, the Court of Appeal dismissed Mohammed Ali's appeal and upheld both his death sentence and murder conviction.

In their judgement, which was delivered and read out by Judge of Appeal Andrew Phang, the three judges hearing the appeal were satisfied that Mohammed Ali was guilty of murder by intentionally inflicting bodily injuries such that it was sufficient in the ordinary cause of nature to cause death by drowning his stepdaughter into the pail of water. They did not accept that Nonoi died not from drowning but from either of the two other alternative causes of death. Their finding of the facts were that there was insufficient evidence to prove such a hypothesis beyond a reasonable doubt. They also rejected the defence of sudden and grave provocation as they found the conduct of Mohammed Ali after he killed Nonoi - his steps to dispose the body and go to full lengths to conceal the truth of Nonoi's death - were methodical and calculated, and his reactions and actions after realising that Nonoi was dead did not fit into what a person's state of mind of panic should be. Besides, they pointed out that the cries from the victim were not sufficiently grave enough a provocation to prompt Mohammed Ali having to drown the victim and thus made the argument of Mohammed Ali's lack of parenting skills unconvincing.

Not only that, Justice Phang read out in the three judges' appeal verdict that they acknowledged that Justice Kan Ting Chiu did not address the issue of whether Nonoi was sexually assaulted by her stepfather, and stated that it was important for the original trial judge to address this. They decided that from the review of the evidence that it was Mohammed Ali who was responsible for the sexual injuries and the sexual assault could have taken place sometime later that day of the murder when Mohammed Ali was alone at home with his stepdaughter. They stated that in the trial, when the defence lawyers cross-examined Mohammed Ali's brother Mohammed Rahim, they tried to make an inference and direct it so that it was someone else who did the sexual assault on Nonoi and tried to pin the blame on Mohammed Rahim, to which the three judges could not accept. The allegations of judicial inference against Justice Kan were also not accepted because from what they viewed Justice Kan's interruptions in the trial and questions posed to the witnesses and Mohammed Ali, he was trying to ascertain the full facts of the case and did not done these interruptions in such a manner such that it gave rise to prejudice against any party.

In conclusion, on the facts they have found, the Court of Appeal dismissed the appeal. A separate appeal to President of Singapore S R Nathan for clemency was also turned down.

== Execution ==
On the morning of 19 December 2008, two years and nine months after the rape and murder of his stepdaughter Nonoi, 32-year-old Mohammed Ali bin Johari was hanged in Changi Prison. After his execution, Mohammed Ali's body was buried in Lim Chu Kang Muslim Cemetery after his funeral. It was reported that before his death, Mohammed Ali told his family that he wanted to be buried near his stepdaughter Nonoi as his final wish.

== Legacy ==
=== Re-enactment ===
The murder case of Nonoi was re-enacted in the year 2009's season of Crimewatch, and it aired as the first episode of the show's year 2009 season on 22 March 2009, four months after Mohammed Ali's execution. In the re-enactment, the real-life police officers and medical professionals, most notably DSP Ang Bee Chin and pathologist Dr Gilbert Lau, who were involved in the investigations of the case appeared on the episode and reprised their respective roles in the investigation of the case. DSP Ang was also briefly interviewed on-screen over the case. In the re-enactment, Singaporean actor Jumari B Mohd portrayed the killer Mohammed Ali, and child actress Ayra Nasha portrayed the victim Nonoi; actress Nurulbadirah and actor Minuddin portrayed Mdm Mastura and Mohammed Ali's elderly father respectively, while Nonoi's other family members (including those from both her mother's and her stepfather's) who were depicted in the re-enactment were portrayed by unknown people.

=== Publication ===
The murder of Nonoi was considered as a notable crime that shook Singapore. In July 2015, Singapore's national daily newspaper The Straits Times published an e-book titled Guilty As Charged: 25 Crimes That Have Shaken Singapore Since 1965, which included the Nonoi murder case as one of the top 25 crimes that shocked the nation since its independence in 1965. The book was borne out of collaboration between the Singapore Police Force and the newspaper itself. The e-book was edited by ST News Associate editor Abdul Hafiz bin Abdul Samad. The paperback edition of the book was published and first hit the bookshelves in end-June 2017. The paperback edition first entered the ST bestseller list on 8 August 2017, a month after its publication.

A 2021 article from The Smart Local named the case of Nonoi's rape and murder as one of the 9 most terrible crimes that brought shock to Singapore in the 2000s.

=== Impact ===
Even after the conclusion of the case, there are still continual mentioning and presence of the Nonoi case in subsequent news reports covering certain cases of child abuse or child deaths by abuse; the case has become a benchmark for such cases due to its notability. One of these cases was the death of 3-year-old toddler Danish Iman Abdullah on 15 December 2010, for which the toddler's mother's boyfriend, 23-year-old Muhammad Raffiq bin Jaffah, who abused the boy to death, was arrested and eventually found guilty of a reduced charge of culpable homicide not amounting to murder. He was also found guilty of unrelated charges of rioting and driving under disqualification. When this incident first came to light, it was reported this incident, together with five other known cases, in which the Nonoi case was the most notably mentioned, were the known cases since 2004 where Malay children experienced abuse by their fathers or their mother's lovers. Consequently, Muhammad Raffiq was sentenced to a total of 10 years' imprisonment and 10 strokes of the cane (8 years and 5 strokes for culpable homicide and 2 years and 5 strokes for rioting). Muhammad Raffiq, who was eventually released on 26 August 2017 after serving two-thirds of his backdated sentence with good behaviour, would later re-offend once again by abusing the younger child of his new girlfriend, and after his arrest in 2018, he was sentenced to 2 years' imprisonment on 6 February 2020 (however, at this point of time, his identity was withheld to protect the identity of his 6-year-old victim).

Another case citing the Nonoi case was the death of 23-month-old Natalie Nikie Alisyia binte Sallehan in January 2009, who was killed by her birth father Sallehan bin Allaudin who found her chewing on his cigarettes and thus beating her to death in a fit of rage. Sallehan, who was initially charged with murder, was later sentenced to 6 years' imprisonment with no caning for culpable homicide by the High Court; upon the prosecution's appeal however, this sentence was increased to 10 years' imprisonment and 10 strokes of the cane by the Court of Appeal. When the death of 2-year-old Sri Alyaniz Nazri came to light, the Nonoi murder case was also brought up in a news report reporting the child's death in October 2009, which was a result of her mother's boyfriend abusing her violently. The boyfriend, Mohd Azhar bin Ghapar, had also headbutted the toddler and stepped on her abdomen, fracturing her ribs. Mohd Azhar was sentenced to 12 years' imprisonment and 12 strokes of the cane.

A more recent case in citation of the Nonoi case was the case of Mohammad Airyl Amirul Haziq Mohamed Ariff, a 4-year-old boy who died from a fractured skull in August 2014. Airyl's mother, Noraidah bte Mohd Yussof, had severely beaten him for not able to recite the numbers 11 to 18 in Malay, and this resulted in him landed into hospital, where he would die four days later despite undergoing an emergency surgery. Noraidah, who was a 32-year-old divorcee at the time of her arrest, was also said to have abused her son since March 2012. Noraidah was consequently found guilty of voluntarily causing grievous hurt and ill-treatment of her son and sentenced to 8 years' imprisonment by the High Court. However, the Court of Appeal, upon hearing the prosecution's appeal, found her sentence manifestly inadequate due to the aggravating circumstances of the case (including the boy's young age and Noraidah's cruelty at the time of the crime) and thus allowed the prosecution's appeal and increased Noraidah's jail term to 14½ years' imprisonment.

The tragedy of Nonoi also brought light to the problems faced by the Malay community in Singapore. Along with two other Malay child deaths, the unfortunate death of 2-year-old Nonoi alarmed Singaporean politician Yaacob Ibrahim, who called on the Malay-Muslim elites of the community to urgently solve such existing problems among the Malays in Singapore.

In March 2012, at the second reading of the Misuse of Drugs (Amendment) Bill in Parliament, in a response to the calls by several Members of Parliament (MP) to abolish the mandatory death penalty, Law Minister of Singapore K. Shanmugam cited the Nonoi murder case along with a few other cases to show the impact of drug trafficking (which warranted a death sentence in Singapore) on the many families whose loved ones were ensnared by drug abuse (in which Mohammed Ali's marijuana addiction made him wanting to use Nonoi to avoid detection by the narcotics enforcement officers on the fateful day he killed her). Shanmugam stated that he acknowledged that there should be compassion to the drug traffickers, but he also raised out the issue of families who were broken apart by drugs as another important factor to be considered. In his own words, Shanmugam said, "We do need to show mercy and compassion to the traffickers but at the same time, we also need to show mercy and compassion to the Nonois, Roses, Nellys and Rickys of this world and thousands of others like them." (the latter three names were referring to the subjects of other cases which Shanmugam cited to show how drugs negatively impacted on drug addicts and their families). His words received support from some politicians like Deputy Prime Minister Teo Chee Hean and MP Christopher de Souza.

Even till 2020, Singaporeans still remembered the case, including those who discussed it as one of Singapore's notable crimes in Reddit.

== See also ==
- Capital punishment in Singapore
- List of solved missing person cases (post-2000)
- List of major crimes in Singapore
