= Choa Chu Kang Columbarium =

Building in Singapore

Coordinates: 1°22′27″N 103°41′11″E

The Choa Chu Kang Columbarium is located within the Choa Chu Kang Cemetery Complex, in Singapore and operated by the National Environment Agency. It houses some 147,000 niches spread over 18 four-storey blocks. It was designed to be a place of peace for the departed and solace for those who visit to pay respect to their deceased loved ones.

It is one of three government operated columbaria in Singapore along with Mandai Crematorium and Columbarium and Yishun Columbarium.
