= Persatuan Bawean Singapura =

Cultural and social group in Singapore

Persatuan Bawean Singapura (English: Singapore Baweanese Association, PBS) is a cultural and social group revolving around the Baweanese race in Singapore. It was founded in 1934. The association strives to promote Baweanese culture and create a community to connect Singaporeans with their Baweanese relatives from Bawean.

Baweanese culture is influenced heavily by Islamic culture as Islam is the major religion on Bawean Island. PBS has often collaborated with other sub-Malay ethnic associations throughout the years for Islamic activities in Singapore, such as jointly celebrating Eid or Ramadhan.

== History ==
The Baweanese migrated to Singapore in the 1800s and settled in ponthuk, a type of Baweanese house. The establishment of Singapore as a trading post became an attractive point for many Baweanese men migrating to Singapore.

PBS was established in 1934 with the intention to help new Baweanese who migrated to settle in the ponthuk in Singapore. Ponthuks such as the Pondok Peranakan Gelam Club (also known as Pondok Gelam), located in a three-storey building in Chinatown, were houses for the community. Pondok Gelam has been established as a historic site by the National Heritage Board since 2000. While these ponthuks started to close down as more Baweanese moved into high rise housing in the 1960s, PBS's role shifted towards promoting and preserving the language and culture of the Baweanese.

Today, there are more Baweanese in Singapore than in Bawean Island.

== Educational projects ==
PBS has released several books to promote Bawean culture.

- Persatuan Bawean Singapura, ed. (2015). Masyarakat Bawean Singapura La-A-Obĕ: 80 tahun Persatuan Bawean Singapura. Singapore: Persatuan Bawean Singapura. ISBN 978-981-09-3799-7.

A book on the history and culture of Baweanese that migrated from Bawean to Singapore. It explains the process of migration that early Baweanese went through and how the culture was established in Singapore.

- Sundusia Rosdi; Rohayah Mohd. Lani (2018). Ponthuk Bawean di Singapura. Persatuan Bawean Singapura. Singapura: Persatuan Bawean Singapura. ISBN 978-981-11-6204-6.

A collection of information on the ponthuk in Singapore that includes layouts, photos, and history of ponthuk. This book was sponsored by Singapore National Heritage Board.

- Mustafi, Amanah (2021). Aocak Phěbiěn: berbahasa Bawean (in Malay). Persatuan Bawean Singapura. ISBN 978-981-14-8443-8.

A Malay to Baweanese dictionary of words and idiom phrases used in Baweanese culture. The book also mentions the root of Baweanese language and how it derived from Sanskrit and takes on some words from Arabic as well.

== See also ==
- Bawean people
- Islam in Singapore
