= Choa Chu Kang Cemetery =

Largest and only functional cemetery in Singapore

Choa Chu Kang Cemetery Cài Cù Gǎng Fén Chǎng (蔡厝港坟場) Kawasan Perkuburan Choa Chu Kang (ڤرقبورن چوا چو كڠ)
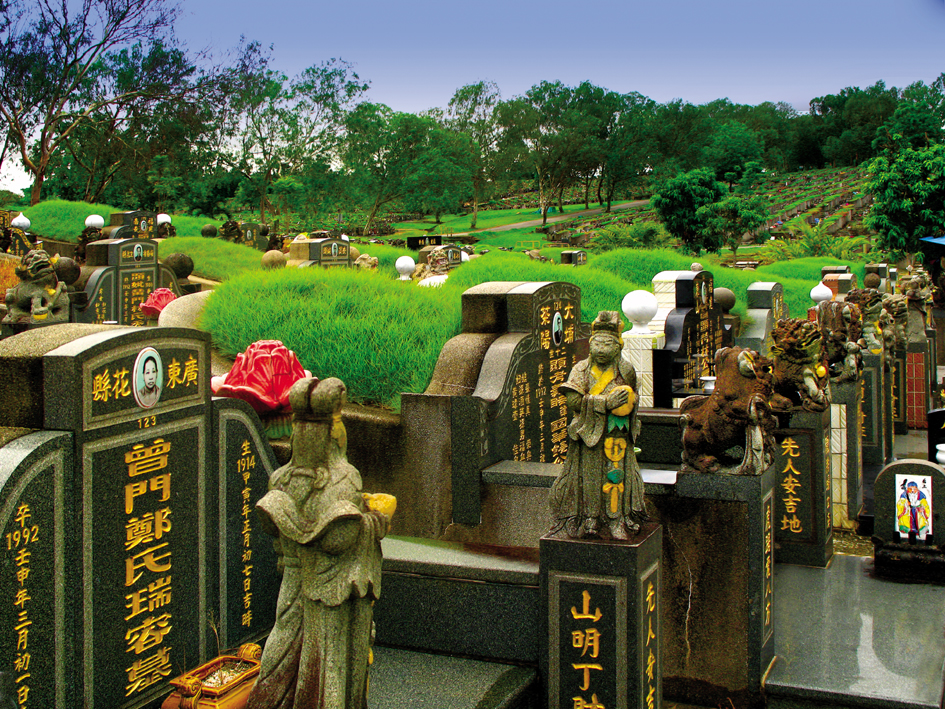
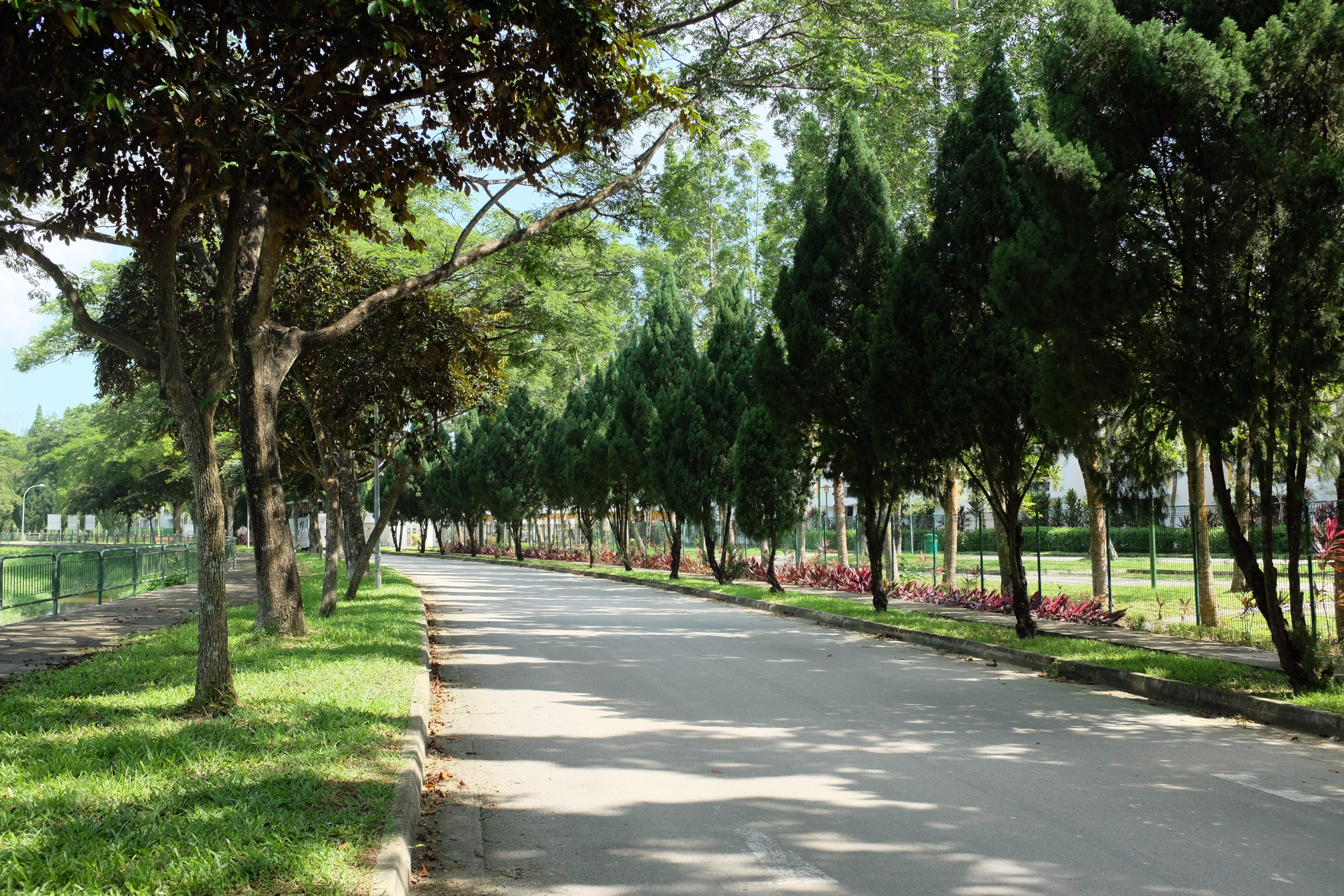
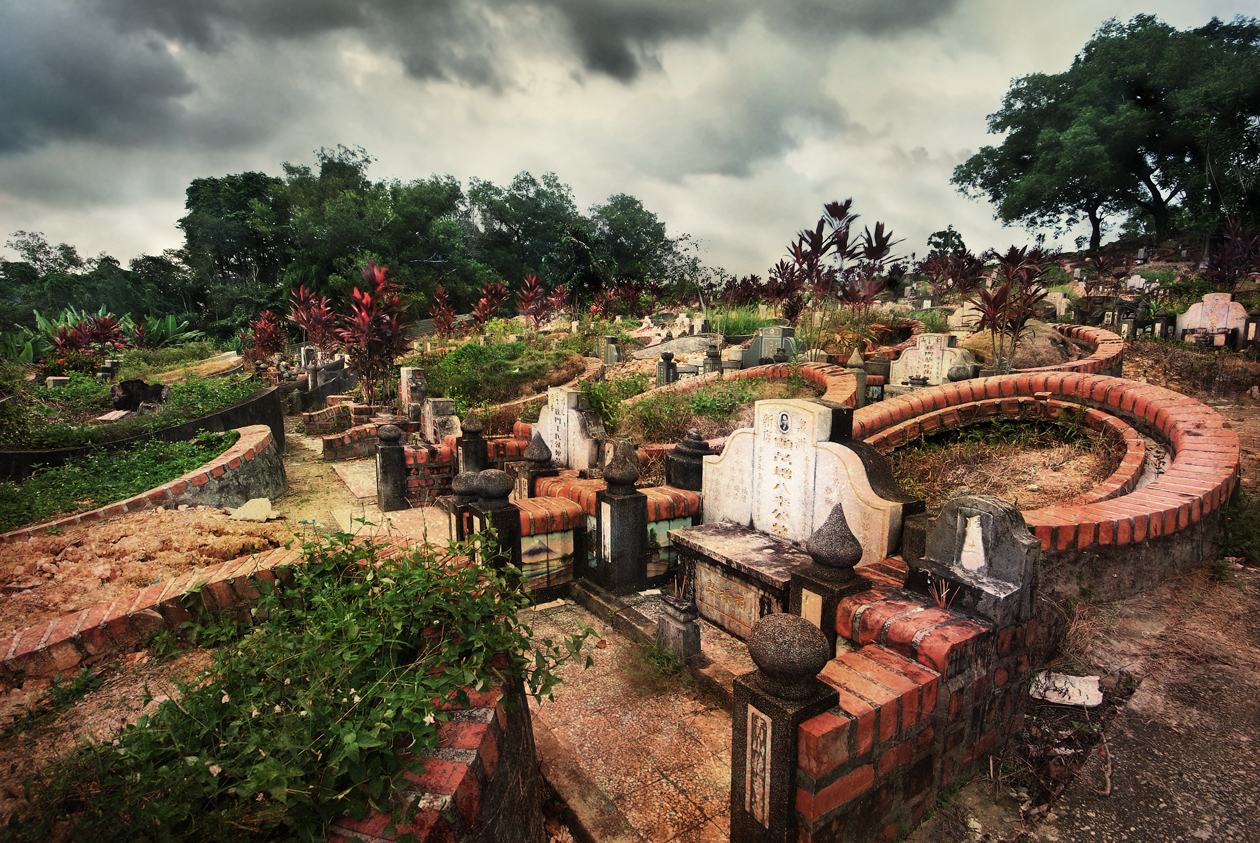
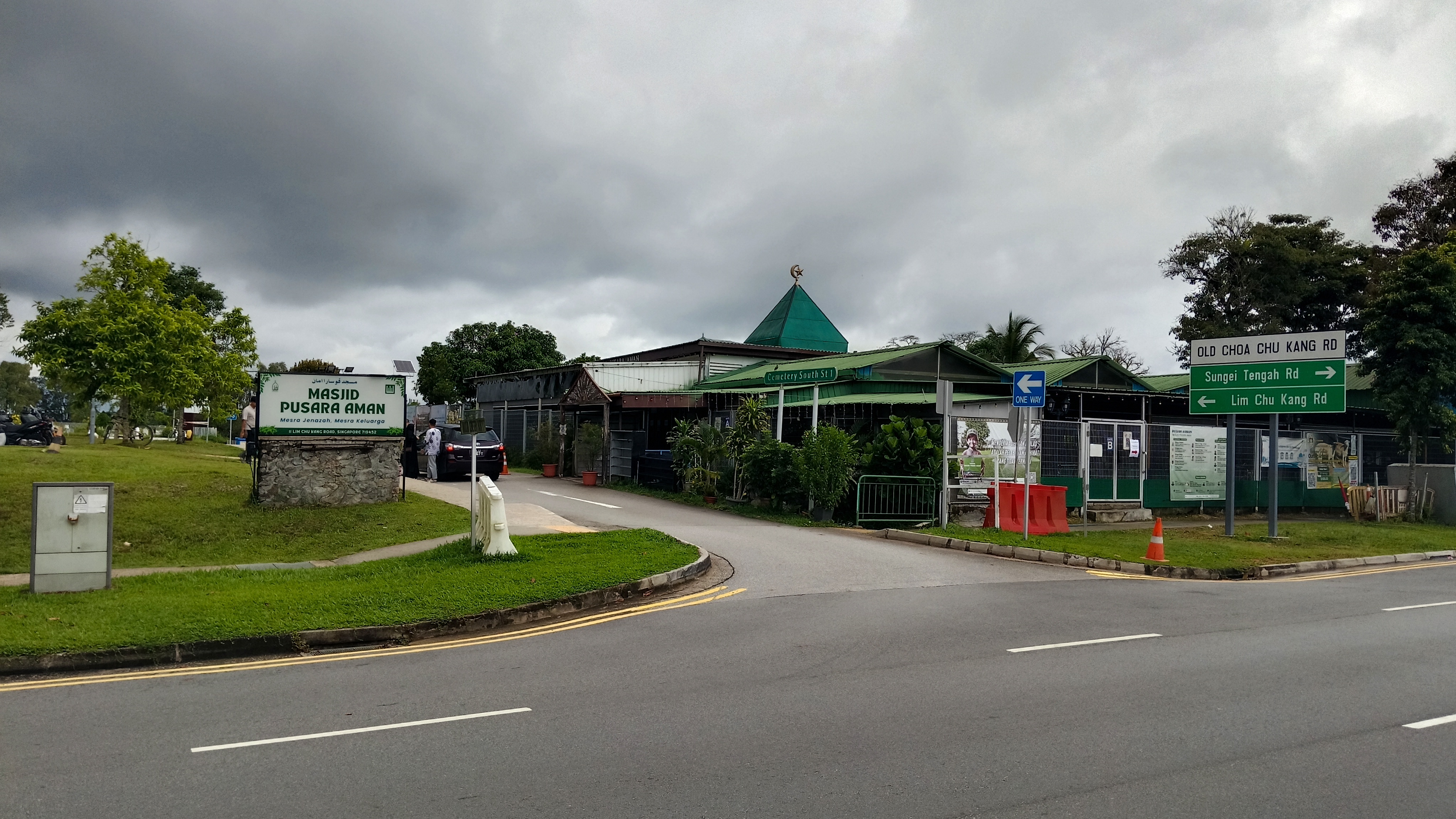

- Location in Singapore

Religion
- Affiliation: See below
- Religious features: See Memorials and Amenities below

Location
- Location: West Region, Singapore
- Country: Singapore
- Coordinates: 1.37820°N 103.69318°E

Architecture
- Type: Cemetery
- Founder: Municipal Commission of Singapore
- Established: 1947

The Choa Chu Kang Cemetery is the largest cemetery in Singapore. It is a multi-faith establishment, with burial grounds for different religions including Buddhism, Taoism, Christianity, Islam and Hinduism. Within the grounds of the cemetery are also different independent amenities such as a chapel, a mosque, columbariums, and funeral parlours.

== History ==
The Choa Chu Kang Cemetery was opened in 1947 by the Municipal Commission of Singapore. It was not only designated as a multi-faith cemetery but also one which took the sects of religions into consideration. Management of the cemetery was also taken up by the National Environment Agency (NEA), which provides guidelines on safety and conservation in the cemetery while also allowing burials to take place. The first ever exhumation in the cemetery took place in 2004, with at least three thousand graves exhumed and reinterred elsewhere in a different portion of the cemetery. Then in July 2017, the NEA announced that at least 45,500 Chinese graves and 35,000 Muslim graves would be exhumed in stages in order to make way for an expansion of the nearby Tengah Air Base. By 2020, at least 64,440 unclaimed Chinese graves were reclaimed by next-of-kin of the deceased.

== Religions ==
The main burial grounds in the cemetery are dedicated to the Chinese, Muslim, Christian, Hindu and Jewish communities. There are two Muslim cemeteries in the area, namely the Pusara Aman and Pusara Abadi burial grounds. The Christian part of the cemetery has sections for Protestants and Roman Catholics, as well as Orthodox Christians. Burial grounds also exist for religious minorities, such as the Parsi community and adherents to the Baháʼí Faith. Although the Ahmadiyya Jama'at is commonly associated with Islam, their burial ground in the cemetery is segregated from the main Muslim burying ground and is not managed by the Majlis Ugama Islam Singapura due to theological differences between Ahmadi and mainstream Sunni Muslims. There is also an unmarked and abandoned Muslim burial ground at the end of Old Choa Chu Kang Road, which predates the current NEA-approved Islamic burial grounds.

Graves in the Choa Chu Kang Cemetery have a fifteen year lease period. After the limit has been reached, the body will be exhumed and reinterred in another part of the cemetery or even cremated if given consent from the family of the deceased.

== Memorials ==
=== WWII memorial ===
A World War II memorial exists in the Chinese sector of the Choa Chu Kang Cemetery. Underneath the memorial is a mass grave of two thousand Chinese civilians that were massacred by Japanese forces at Bamboo Lane, now part of present-day Rochor.

=== SilkAir Flight MI185 Memorial ===
This memorial was erected in 1998 to honour the passengers and crew of the SilkAir Flight 185, all of whom were killed in a crash on 19 December 1997. Funded by SilkAir themselves, the memorial is made from polished black marble, with the names of the victims of the crash inscribed in gold. It is one of two memorials relating to the incident, the other one located in Palembang.

== Amenities ==
=== Places of worship ===
The Muslim portion of the cemetery is served by Masjid Pusara Aman, a congregational mosque at the entrance of the cemetery. Built in 1972, the mosque holds both the five daily prayers and the Friday prayer while also having a second role as a funeral parlour where the deceased Muslim is washed and wrapped for burial. A zinc-roofed shelter in the northwestern corner of the mosque was converted into a cafe in 2014.

There is also a chapel at the entrance of the Christian portion of the cemetery. It is regularly used for religious ceremonies and prayers. The chapel is served by its own bus stop that is accessible from bus services 172 and 405.

=== Columbaria ===
The Choa Chu Kang Columbarium is the main columbaria of the cemetery. Described as "mansion-like," it has at least 300,000 niches and has a rectangular layout with rounded edges. The columbarium is directly operated by the government, making it one of three columbaria with the same status. It can be found at the end of the fourth path of the Chinese cemetery.

Established in 1999, the Garden of Remembrance is a Christian columbarium, built in the style of modernist architecture with the general appearance of the building resembling two palms outstretched in prayer. It was officially reopened on 29 September 2001 after a major reconstruction.

The Nirvana Memorial Garden is a Buddhist columbarium, founded between in 1990 and reopened in 2009 by the Nirvana Foundation. The interior of the columbarium resembles a hotel, with cushioned seats and common areas that feature crystal decorations. It is adjacent to the Choa Chu Kang Crematorium, directly opposite the Ahmadiyya burial ground.

Other colombaria in the site include the An-Le Memorial Hall, also known as Mount Prajna, which was opened in March 2005 by local company Intersanctuary.

=== Cremation facilities ===
There is only one crematorium in the cemetery, the Choa Chu Kang Crematorium, which is adjacent to the Nirvana Memorial Garden. Like the main columbarium of the cemetery, the crematorium is fully managed by the government through the NEA. It is one of two government-owned crematories in Singapore, the other being the Mandai Crematorium.

The Garden of Peace is a miniature garden in the heart of the cemetery. The purpose of the garden is for families to scatter the ashes of their deceased, with designated lanes for such procedures to be carried out that allows for the ashes to mix with the soil. It is the first in-land ash-scattering garden in the country and was opened in 2021.

== See also ==
- Death in Singapore
