= Medical (Therapy, Education and Research) Act =

Statute of the Parliament of Singapore

Medical (Therapy, Education and Research) Act 1972

Parliament of Singapore
- Long title: An Act to make provision for the use of the bodies of deceased persons or parts thereof for purposes of medical or dental education, research, advancement of medical or dental science, therapy and transplantation, and for other purposes connected therewith.
- Enacted by: Parliament of Singapore
- Enacted: 1972
- Status: In force

The Medical (Therapy, Education and Research) Act 1972 (MTERA) is an opt-in scheme enacted in 1972 by the Government of Singapore. It is designed to empower Singaporeans to donate their organs as well as any body parts upon their demise.

== Uses ==
Traditionally in Singapore, Muslims believe body desecration in life or death to be forbidden, and thus many reject organ transplant. However most Muslim authorities nowadays accept the practice if another life will be saved. In countries such as Singapore with a cosmopolitan populace that includes Muslims, the special Majlis Ugama Islam Singapura governing body is formed to look after the interests of Singapore's Muslim community over issues that includes their burial arrangements.

Organ harvesting and transplantation in Singapore being thus optional for Muslims, is generally overseen by the National Organ Transplant Unit of the Ministry of Health (Singapore).

The implementations of organ harvesting and organ transplant may vary from each approved institution. As an example, the Singapore General Hospital Skin Bank may harvest skin from the dead donor within 15 hours of death. 0.025 cm to 0.046 cm of the outer layer of the skin – mostly from the hidden areas of the body, such as the back and thighs – is harvested using a special instrument called the dermatome, so that the donor may still have an open casket funeral.

Implementations of organ transplant such as the heart transplant programme by National Heart Centre Singapore (NHCS) may usually be enabled by the Human Organ Transplant Act (HOTA), such as the case of Wong Wing Chun who died at the age of 49. His liver, kidney, corneas were donated by his wife Lim Yoke Pay, who also donated his skin and iliac arteries as well.

The Live On social awareness movement is also formed to educate Singaporeans on organ donation.
