= Masjid Al-Firdaus =

Mosque located along Old Choa Chu Kang Road in Singapore

Masjid Al-Firdaus مسجد الفردوس

- Location in Singapore

Religion
- Affiliation: Sunni Islam

Location
- Location: 11 Jalan Ibadat, Singapore 698955
- Country: Singapore
- Coordinates: 1.3747661°N 103.7161691°E

Architecture
- Type: Mosque
- Style: Malay architecture
- Established: c. 1964
- Completed: 1968 (original structure) c. 1999 (current building)

Masjid Al-Firdaus (Jawi: مسجد الفردوس) is a congregational mosque located along Jalan Ibadat in Choa Chu Kang, Singapore. Built in 1968, it is adjacent to the Keat Hong Camp is situated along Jalan Ibadat, a road that branches off from Old Choa Chu Kang Road. Like all mosques in Singapore that are built after 1970, the mosque is managed by the Majlis Ugama Islam Singapura (MUIS).

== Etymology ==
The word "Al-Firdaus" in the name of the mosque is an Arabic term that refers to the highest stage of Jannah, the Islamic concept of heaven. The road leading to the mosque is known as Jalan Ibadat, which is a Malay phrase that literally translates to "Road of Worship."

== History ==
By 1964, a small mosque had been established on a plot of land along Old Choa Chu Kang Road to serve as a place of worship for Muslim personnel stationed in the nearby military bases, such as the Tengah Air Base. The mosque was later named Masjid Al-Firdaus and completed in 1968, with the inauguration ceremony led by local politician Ya'acob bin Mohamed. A road leading directly to the mosque was also erected around the same time and named Jalan Ibadat to reflect the fact that it led to a place of worship ("Tempat ibadat" in Malay). Management of the mosque was also given to the Majlis Ugama Islam Singapura (MUIS), while the mosque itself was given a Temporary Occupation License, which required triennal payments from the MUIS to allow the mosque to be retained on the land.

The interior of the mosque.

Collections of donations to fund a complete reconstruction of the mosque began in early 1983. Masjid Al-Firdaus was then fully reconstructed by 1999, featuring a new appearance that was predominately blue in colour and took the form of a concrete structure resembling a surau, with a zinc roof and single faux minaret while the dome on the original mosque had been removed. By 2017, the congregants of Masjid Al-Firdaus were primarily composed of soldiers and personnel from the nearby Keat Hong Camp, Home Team Academy and the Tengah Air Base, with a sizeable number being Indian Muslim immigrant workers. During the COVID-19 pandemic, the mosque was shut down as part of a nationwide mosque closure.

In 2025, Muhammad Faishal Ibrahim, then the Acting Minister-in-charge of Muslim Affairs, announced that Masjid Al-Firdaus would be demolished in the 2030s to make way for redevelopments in the area. The construction of a new mosque near Brickland Road was also announced, with the new mosque intended to replace Masjid Al-Firdaus. After the new mosque had been completed, it would be renamed the Al-Firdaus Mosque is recognition of the older mosque that had stood at Choa Chu Kang for sixty-three years. In the meantime, Masjid Al-Firdaus would continue to operate until the new mosque had been fully completed, which was expected to happen in the 2030s.

== Transportation ==
Masjid Al-Firdaus is adjacent to the Keat Hong Camp and shared two bus stops with the military camp. There are no other forms of public transportation in the immediate vicinity of the mosque.

== See also ==
- Islam in Singapore
- List of mosques in Singapore
