= Masjid Pusara Aman =

Mosque located along Lim Chu Kang Road, Singapore

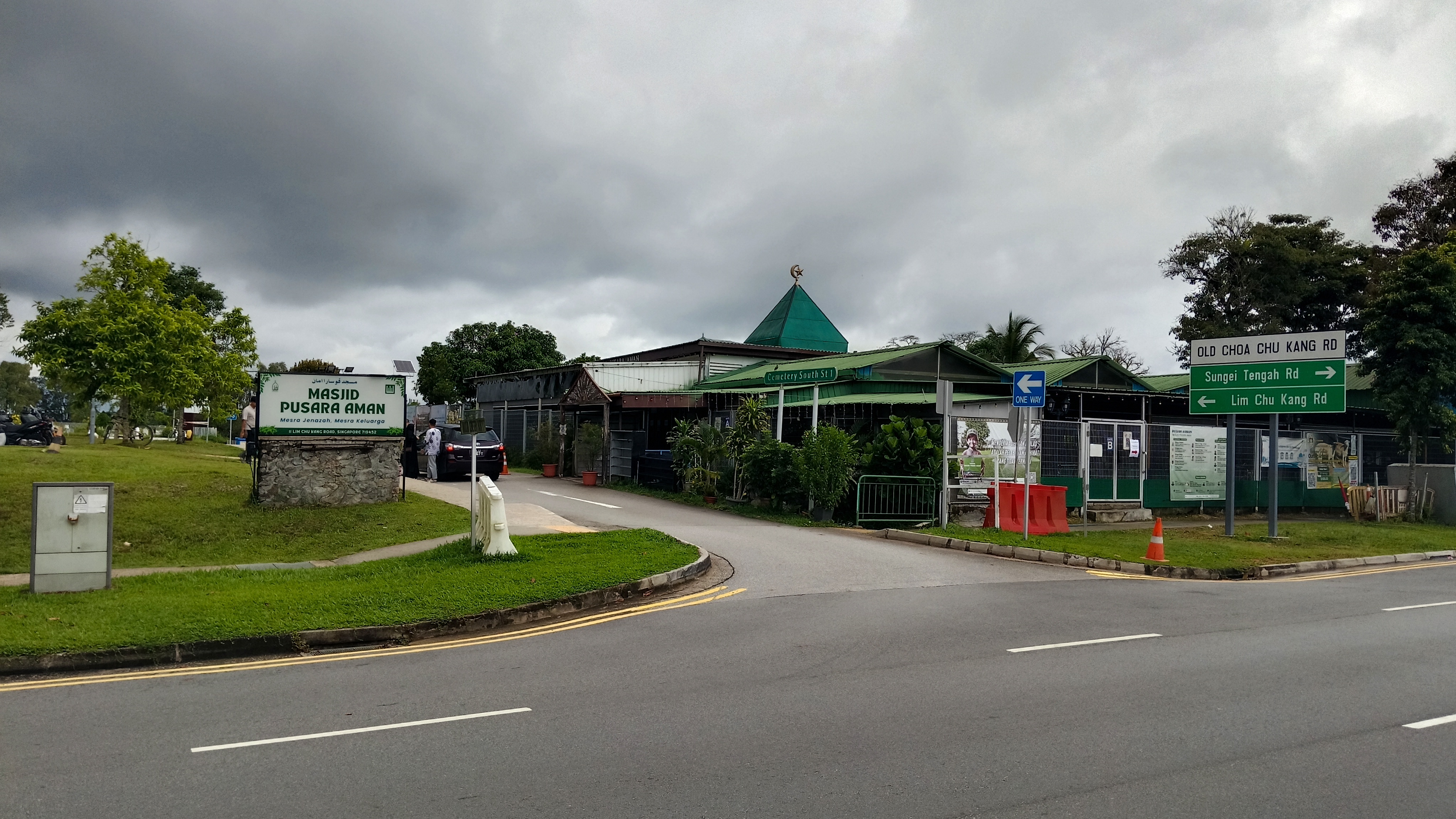
- Masjid Pusara Aman in 2026.

- Location in Singapore

Religion
- Affiliation: Sunni Islam

Location
- Location: 11 Lim Chu Kang Rd, Singapore 719452
- Country: Singapore
- Coordinates: 1.3728381°N 103.6942535°E

Architecture
- Type: Mosque, funeral parlour
- Style: Malay architecture
- Completed: 1972

Masjid Pusara Aman (Jawi: مسجد بوسارا أمان) is a mosque located in Choa Chu Kang, Singapore. Built in 1972 and opened in 1974, it stands at the entrance of the Pusara Aman Muslim Cemetery, serving as both a congregational mosque and a funeral parlour.

== History ==
After the opening of the Pusara Aman Muslim Cemetery on 14 January 1974, a site at the entrance of the cemetery was allocated for the construction of a mosque. The mosque had been completed as early as 1972 at a cost of $276,000 but had not been named by the Majlis Ugama Islam Singapura (MUIS), and remained closed to the public due to lack of furnishings such as carpets and bookshelves for Islamic literature. Ultimately, the mosque was named Masjid Pusara Aman and was officially opened in July 1974, holding a Mawlid celebration in September of the same year. The MUIS also authorized the mosque to conduct the Eid prayers during the Islamic occasion of Eid al-Adha in 1979. Along with the nearby Masjid Al-Firdaus, Masjid Pusara Aman was classified as a building under the Temporary Occupation License, requiring yearly payments in order to ensure the survival of the mosque.

During a remodel of the Muslim cemetery in 2007, at least ten thousand graves were exhumed and the remains sent to the mosque for re-wrapping before they could be reburied at a new burial plot. In 2017, the funeral prayer for former cabinet minister Othman Wok was held at the Sultan Mosque at Kampong Glam, before his body was transported to Masjid Pusara Aman for final preparations before burial.

== Architecture ==
Masjid Pusara Aman is built in a contemporary architectural style that is intended to be reminiscent of Malay village houses. The main prayer hall and central chamber of the mosque is square in layout, with a pyramidal roof on top of a zinc base that replaces the traditional dome. Next to the main prayer hall are areas for ritual ablution, as well as rooms which serve as the funeral parlour where the body of the deceased is washed and wrapped in the white shroud, known as a "kain kafan." The hallway outside the main prayer hall is used for the funeral prayers which are led by a cleric from the mosque committee, while a classroom at the side is used as a storage room for maintenance and audio equipment. In the northwestern corner of the mosque is a zinc shelter which was later converted into a cafe to fund the mosque in 2014.

== Transportation ==
Masjid Pusara Aman is situated at the entrance of the Pusara Aman Muslim Cemetery and is accessible via public transport only from the bus stops opposite the mosque which are named "Pusara Aman Mque" and "Aft Cemy Chapel."

== See also ==
- Pusara Aman Muslim Cemetery
- List of mosques in Singapore
