= Forensic Medicine Division =

The Forensic Medicine Division of the Applied Sciences Group of the Health Sciences Authority is a forensic medical consultancy service of the government of Singapore. The Centre provides professional consultancy services in the field of forensic medicine, primarily to law enforcement in support of the coronial death investigation system in Singapore as well as criminal investigations into homicidal deaths. The Division operates a mortuary facility in Block 9, a Singapore General Hospital building along Outram Road.

== History ==
In the 1960s to 1980s, the Department of Forensic Medicine (DFM) was a section within the Department of Pathology under the Ministry of Health. In 1989, it was known as the Department of Forensic Medicine within the Institute of Science and Forensic Medicine (ISFM). When the Health Sciences Authority (HSA) of Singapore came into being on 1 April 2001, DFM was renamed the Centre for Forensic Medicine and became one of seven centres within the Health Sciences Authority. With effect from 1 August 2008, it is renamed the Forensic Medicine Division, a part of the Applied Sciences Group, Health Sciences Authority.

From the 1960s, the section and then Department of Forensic Medicine was led by the late Professor Chao Tzee Cheng, who is deemed by many to be the "Father of Forensic Medicine" in Singapore. Prof Chao had been involved in many high-profile homicides and had documented some of them in his book Murder is my Business. The current Divisional Director is Dr. Paul Chui.

== Services ==
FMD provides medical consultancy services to the State Coroner in support of death investigation in Singapore. It also provides forensic medical consultancy on request in clinical forensic cases. It also provides technical support to the Singapore Police Force in the handling of sexual assault kits. Autopsy services for non-Coroner's cases are also available on request.

The Division is staffed by Forensic Pathologists, Technical support officers, Mortuary technicians and administrative staff. It has been accredited by the National Association of Medical Examiners (NAME), successfully in 2005, the first centre to achieve accreditation outside of North America. The late Professor Chao Tzee Cheng, generally acknowledged as the Father of Forensic Medicine in Singapore, was the first professional head. Dr Wee Keng Poh took over the helm in the late 1990s. The team is now headed by Dr Paul Chui since April 2001.

The mortuary facility resides on the ground floor of Block 9 along Outram Road. Prior to this location, the mortuary was located at the present junction of Second Hospital Avenue and Outram Road. Presently, the facility houses a main autopsy suite as well as an adjoining x-ray facility and an isolation autopsy suite. Originally built in the early 1980s, it was extensively renovated and upgraded in March to June 2003, during the SARS outbreak in Singapore. Part of the upgrading in 2003 included a larger public waiting area, incorporation of biosafety systems and practices; and re-orientation of the internal layout with sequestration of claiming areas. Transformational change to the grounds meant that trees and shrubs that once hid the building from view for decades were pruned to introduce more natural lighting to the compound as well as the waiting area; to alleviate the sense of gloom and doom and the sense of fear and trepidation to passers-by as well as leading to overall improvement of security in the compound.
