= Paya Lebar MRT station =

Mass Rapid Transit station in Geylang, Singapore

Paya Lebar EW8 CC9 巴耶利峇 பாய லேபார்
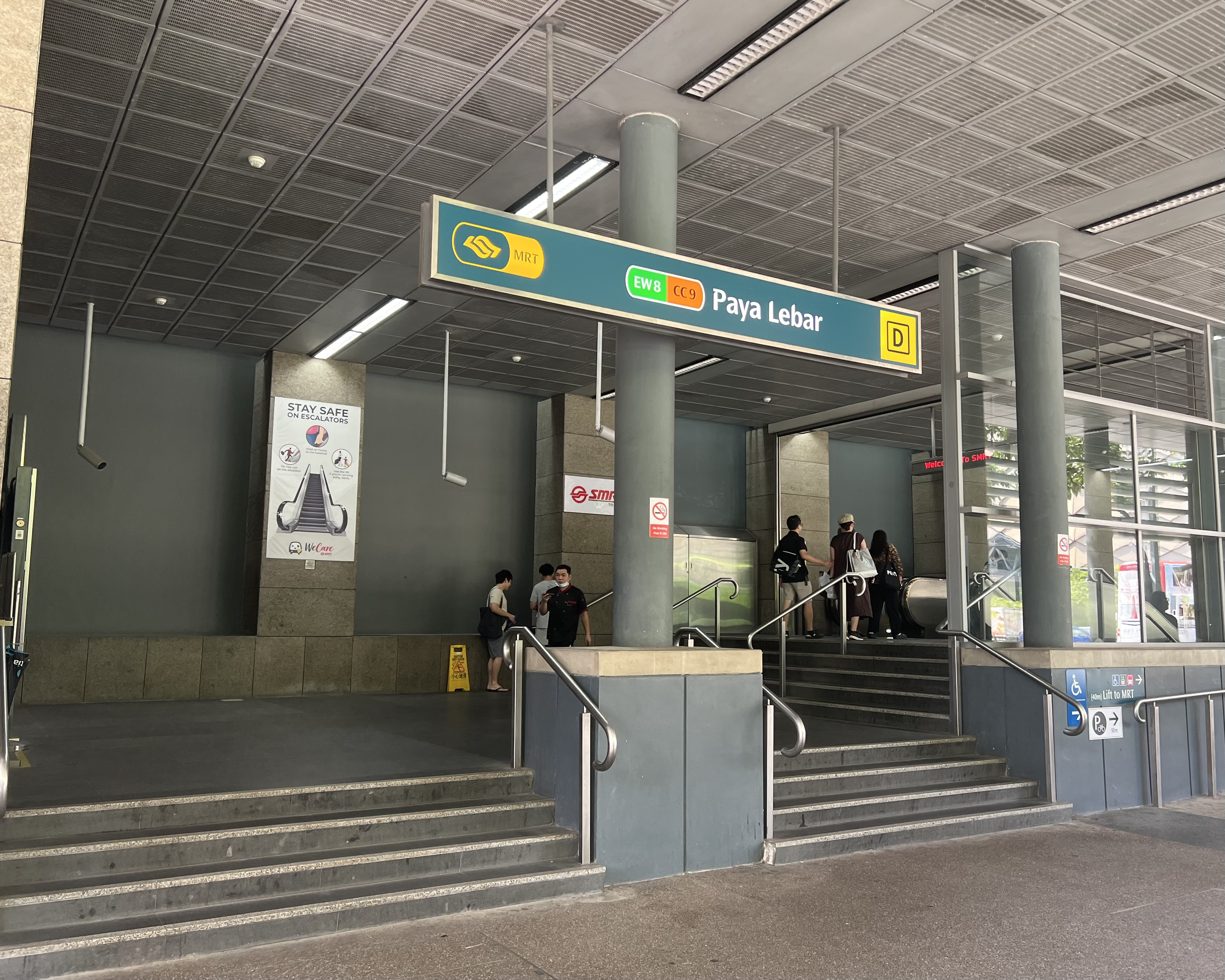
- Exit D of Paya Lebar station

General information
- Location: 30 Paya Lebar Road, Singapore 409006 (EWL); 15 Paya Lebar Road, Singapore 409049 (CCL)
- Coordinates: 01°19′04″N 103°53′33″E
- System: Mass Rapid Transit (MRT) interchange
- Owner: Land Transport Authority
- Operator: SMRT Trains
- Line: East–West Line Circle Line
- Platforms: 6 (3 island platforms)
- Tracks: 2 (East–West Line); 3 (Circle Line) (Note: 2 in regular operation.)
- Connections: Bus, Taxi

Construction
- Structure type: Elevated (East–West Line); Underground (Circle Line)
- Platform levels: 2
- Cycle facilities: Yes
- Accessible: Yes

History
- Opened: 4 November 1989; 37 years ago (East–West Line); 17 April 2010; 16 years ago (Circle Line)

Passengers
- June 2024: 46,030 per day

Services
Preceding station	Mass Rapid Transit	Following station
Eunos towards Pasir Ris	East–West Line	Aljunied towards Tuas Link
Dakota Clockwise	Circle Line	MacPherson Anticlockwise
Dakota towards Dhoby Ghaut	Circle Line	MacPherson towards Prince Edward Road
Track layout
Location
- Location within Singapore Rail central area

Paya Lebar MRT station (Note: /ˈpaɪə ˌleɪbɑːr/ PYE-ə LAY-bar) is a Mass Rapid Transit (MRT) station in Geylang, Singapore. Paya Lebar is an interchange station on the East–West Line (EWL) and Circle Line (CCL) and serves various nearby landmarks such as the Masjid Wak Tanjong, Tanjong Katong Complex, and PLQ Mall.

Paya Lebar appeared in plans for the initial MRT system in May 1982, and it was designated to be under Phase IIA of the MRT. Construction of the station began in January 1986 with a joint venture between Oh Teck Thye and Okumura Corporation. The former was put under receivership (a process in which the management of an organisation's financial assets is transferred to another party) in December 1986 as it failed to repay its debts to the United Overseas Bank, resulting in Okumura continuing the project alone. Paya Lebar, along with 9 other stations from Marina Bay to Tanah Merah, opened on 4 November 1989.

In April 1996, a piling hammer from a nearby construction project damaged a rail viaduct near Paya Lebar station, leading to the Land Transport Authority (LTA) to strengthen its regulations on works conducted near MRT viaducts. Paya Lebar station was announced in November 1999 to be an interchange between the planned Marina Line and Outer Circle Line, both of which were merged to become the CCL in April 2001. However, the Nicoll Highway Collapse halted construction of Paya Lebar's CCL station in April 2004. Construction resumed a couple of months later. The station became an interchange station with the CCL on 17 April 2010.

Like most stations in Phase IIA, Paya Lebar's EWL station has a domed roof. The CCL station was built in a futuristic architectural style. The station has three public artworks: The Signs of Times by Salleh Japar, which consists of abstract pictographs depicting the evolution of the Paya Lebar area; Art Seats, which are benches that have a dot matrix and raindrop pattern; and The Paya Lebar Story, a mural depicting landmarks of the Paya Lebar area.

== History ==
=== East–West Line ===
The Mass Rapid Transit (MRT) system was conceptualised in a 1971 study conducted by the Singapore Government and the United Nations Development Programme. The study – which assessed land-use transportation needs – concluded that Singapore would need a rail transit system by 1992. Further studies and debates on the feasibility of building a rapid transit system took place from 1972 to 1980, with Paya Lebar station appearing in initial plans by May 1982. Paya Lebar was proposed to be constructed as part of the 32.6 kilometres (20.3 mi) East–West Line (EWL), which was to have 22 stations and run from Jurong West to Bedok. On 30 May 1982, communications minister Ong Teng Cheong confirmed that the government approved construction of the MRT; the system was planned to be constructed in three phases, with Paya Lebar part of "Phase II", which was 40 km (25 mi) long and composed of 22 stations. (Note: Although previous studies concluded that the EWL should be constructed first, the government chose to construct the North–South Line (NSL) first, another line proposed in those studies, though The Straits Times noted that this would not imply that the NSL would have to be built first before the EWL can begin construction.) Phase II would be constructed in different sections, with Paya Lebar specifically part of "Phase IIA", which consisted of 13 stations from City Hall to Pasir Ris.

From May to June 1984, the Mass Rapid Transit Corporation (MRTC) called for the prequalification of consultants to design the civil, architectural, and structural works for Phase IIA stations. Ten companies were shortlisted by July. The MRTC awarded the contract to an American–Singapore consortium between De Leuw Cather, Wilbur Smith & Associates, Skidmore Owings Merrill, and Singaporean firm RSP Architects in October for S$11.5 million (1984) (US$5.39 million). The Straits Times reported in November that Phase II was ahead of schedule by two years due to the successful timing for Phase I. By May 1985, there were seven tenderers that prequalified for Contract 302, which involved the construction of Paya Lebar station's viaducts, and Contract 303, which initially detailed the construction of Paya Lebar station and a viaduct from Paya Lebar to Eunos. Ultimately, Contract 302 was awarded to a partnership between Lee Kim Tah and the French company Societe Generale D'Enterprises Sainrapt Et Brice at a sum of S$59.52 million in November 1985. A month later, Contract 303 was awarded to a Japanese–Singaporean joint venture between Okumura Corporation and Oh Teck Thye, which had the lowest price among five other tenderers, for S$60 million (1985) (US$27.27 million) in December 1985. Okumura had a 60% interest in the contract whilst Oh Teck Thye had 40%. By then, the contract also included the construction of Eunos and viaducts to Kembangan station.

Work on Contract 303 began in December 1985, and construction of Paya Lebar station began in early 1986; the project was expected to be completed by December 1988. By February 1986, 41% of the contract had been completed. In July, Swiss–Singaporean company VSL Singapore was awarded the subcontract for the supply of post-tensioned cables and precast beams for the station's viaducts. The joint venture between Okumura and Oh Teck Thye was terminated on 30 December 1986, after which the former undertaking all the responsibilities of Contract 303. Oh Teck Thye owed S$3 million (1987) (US$1.42 million) to the United Overseas Bank (UOB) and was placed under the receivership of Peat Marwick Mitchell when it failed to repay its debts. Meanwhile, Okumura requested permission to take over Oh Teck Thye's part of the contract. Soon Neo Lim of The Business Times described it as "the first case of a joint-venture split in the MRT Project".

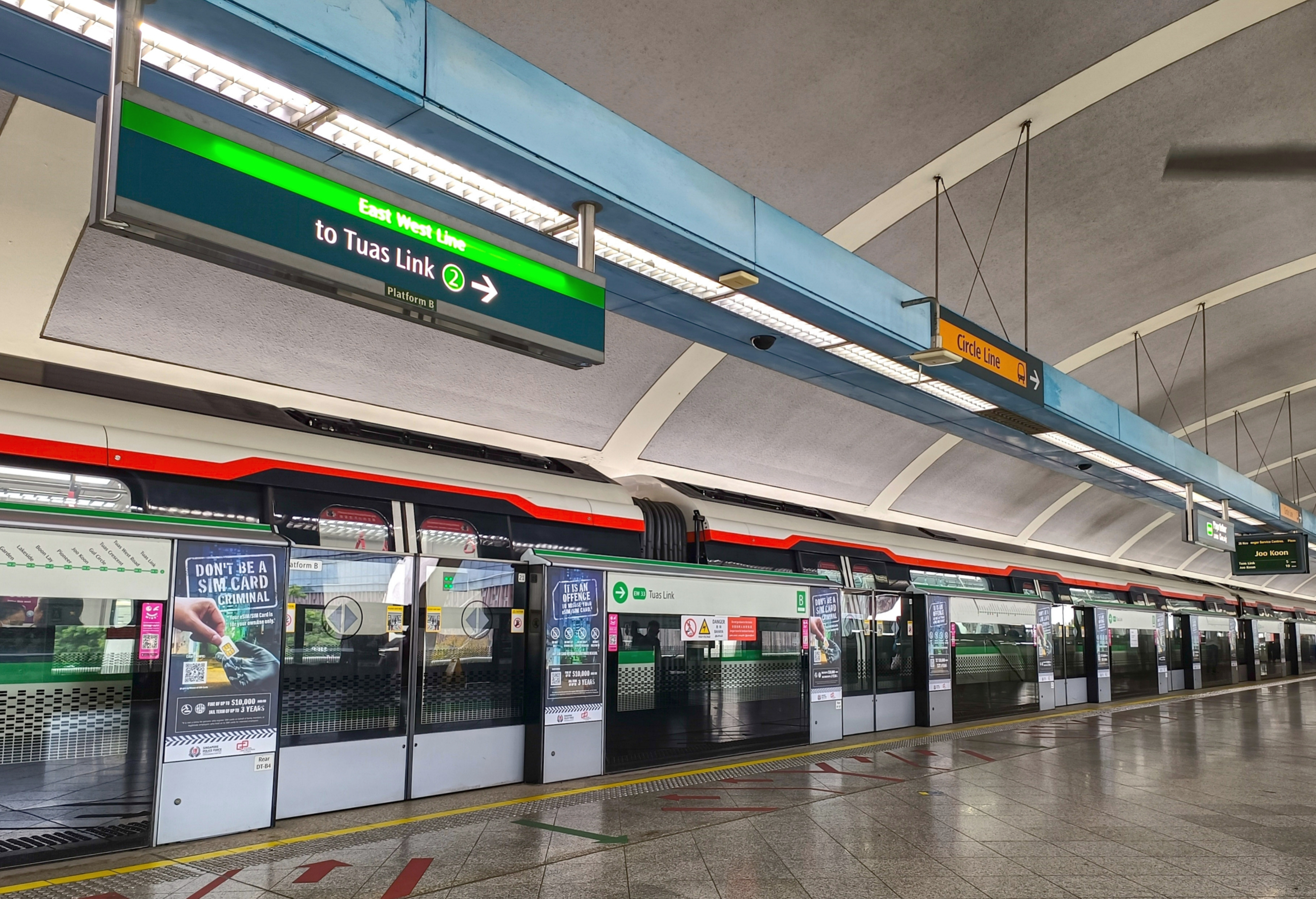
Platform screen doors were installed at Paya Lebar's EWL platforms in 2011.

Although stations in the City Hall–Changi stretch were initially expected to commence operations by December 1989, The Straits Times reported in February 1989 that Phase IIA was ahead of schedule and could commence operations in the last quarter of the year. Civil works for Paya Lebar station were fully completed by April 1989 and from August, test runs were conducted on the City Hall–Tanah Merah (Note: Changi station was renamed to Tanah Merah in March 1987.) stretch to check the trains and tracks. By then, communications minister Yeo Ning Hong announced that stations within the City Hall–Tanah Merah stretch would open on 18 November, though by September, the opening date was moved ahead two weeks as the test runs were ahead of schedule. Paya Lebar, along with 9 other stations between Marina Bay and Tanah Merah, opened on 4 November 1989.

On 8 April 1996, a pilling hammer from the construction site of a condominium project fell on to rail viaducts close to Paya Lebar station, damaging the viaduct's railing and parapet. Train services between Eunos and Aljunied were disrupted for 80 minutes. The incident prompted the Land Transport Authority (LTA) to review its safety measures for construction sites near MRT viaducts, and a month later, the LTA strengthened its guidelines on conducting work near MRT viaducts, which included making all piling works forbidden within 6 metres (20 ft) of a viaduct. On 4 April 2007 at 10:20 am, a man died after being hit by a train. Eastbound services were disrupted for about 40 minutes. Following an increase in track intrusions, the LTA and SMRT decided in January 2008 to install platform screen doors at all elevated MRT stations. After several successful tests at different stations, works to install half-height platform screen doors were expected to start in 2010; they were installed at Paya Lebar station by August 2011.

=== Circle Line ===
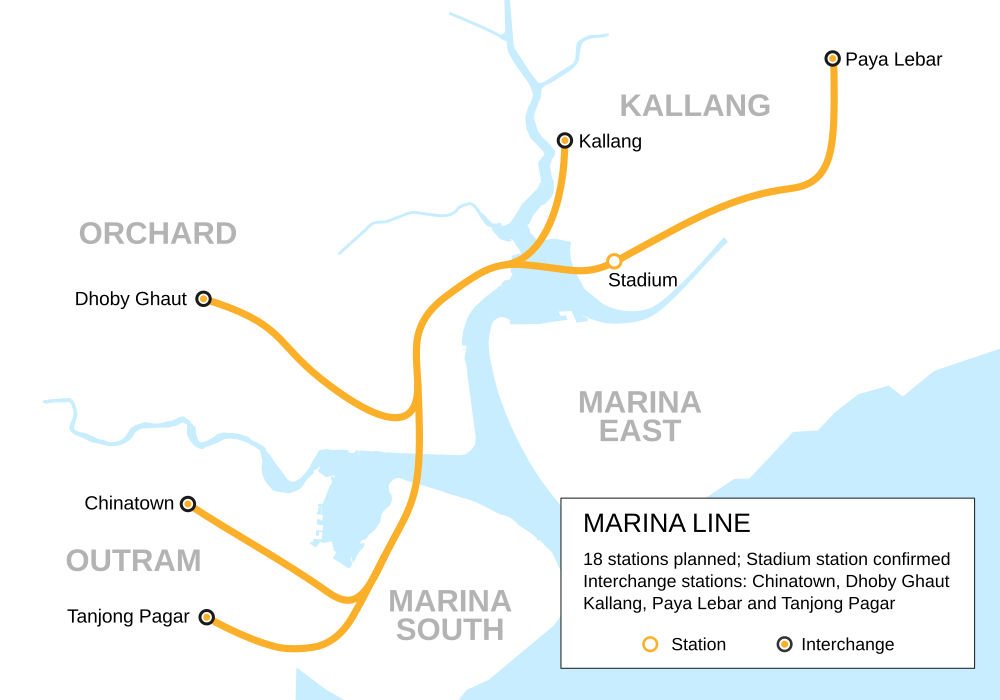
By November 1999, the Marina Line was planned to interchange with the EWL and Outer Circle Line. The Marina Line and Outer Circle Line would be merged to create the Circle Line in April 2001.

The LTA announced the Marina Line (MRL) in October 1997, a 12 km (7.5 mi) underground line that would comprise 18 stations and run from Kallang station to People's Park via Marina Centre and Marina South. Further branches and extensions to Paya Lebar and Tanjong Pagar were under consideration. Communications minister Mah Bow Tan announced in June 1998 that the government would construct the MRL, with Parsons Brinckerhoff and Mott MacDonald appointed as the MRL's architectural and engineering consultants; by then, the MRL was planned to interchange with the EWL at either Kallang or Paya Lebar station. In October 1999, the LTA announced that the Outer Circle Line, a rail line connecting Paya Lebar, Serangoon, Bishan, and Buona Vista stations, was under study. The line was expected to be operational by 2006. A month later, a senior manager at the LTA revealed that the MRL was planned to be extended from the National Stadium to Paya Lebar station, where it would interchange with the Outer Circle Line. Communications minister Yeo Cheow Tong announced in April 2001 that the MRL would be built as the first phase of the Circle Line (CCL); the second phase of the CCL was to span 5 kilometres (3.1 mi) from Stadium Boulevard to Upper Paya Lebar Road. Work for the second phase was expected to start in the next year.

Paya Lebar under construction in 2009

Contract 823 for the construction of Paya Lebar station was awarded to a joint venture between Lum Chang Building Contractors and Nishimatsu Construction at a sum of S$320 million (US$238.81 million) in August 2002. The contract also includes the construction of the Mountbatten and Dakota stations. Construction of the station started in the same month. The foundations of two rail viaduct pillars were obstructing the works needed for the station, so they were underpinned. The underpinning, which became the first such operation to be carried out on an operational MRT line, was the most challenging aspect of constructing Paya Lebar's CCL station. A concrete wall, a concrete beam, and a powerful jacking device were used to transfer the load of the viaduct to other structures. The old piles were removed and new piles were constructed. During the process, many monitoring devices were installed, and spare materials and tools were prepared in case the pillars titled. Several roads around the station were converted to one-way traffic to facilitate the construction. A bus stop was also temporary relocated. A stretch of Sims Avenue was also temporarily realigned. When the roads were reinstated, an extra lane for each direction of Paya Lebar Road was added.

On 20 April 2004, a tunnel construction site near the Nicoll Highway caved in, leading to the collapse of the road. The LTA halted work at stations under the Nishimatsu–Lum Chang joint venture to review their sites, delaying the opening of the CCL to 2009. The LTA and the Building and Construction Authority (BCA) announced a few days later that stations affected by the LTA's halt may resume deep digging, though they must go through two rounds of safety checks: one from the LTA and one from the BCA. By June, the BCA approved the construction of Paya Lebar's CCL station. However, additional struts and support structures were required to be installed as the station's construction site had soft marine clay similar to the site of the Nicoll Highway collapse. A residential building near Paya Lebar's CCL construction site, the Hock Kee House, had to be vacated as the LTA felt that the building would be unstable once deep excavation of the site resumes. Despite criticism from residents over the LTA's short notice, the building was fully vacated and demolished. In August 2009, transport minister Raymond Lim announced that Paya Lebar, along with other stations from Dhoby Ghaut to Tai Seng, would open by the first half of 2010; the date was later announced to be 17 April. As announced in March, an open house was held at stations in the Dhoby Ghaut–Tai Seng stretch by the LTA on 4 April 2010. The Circle line station, along with other stations in that section, opened on 17 April 2010.

== Station details ==
=== Services ===
An entrance to Paya Lebar station

Paya Lebar station serves as an interchange station between the EWL and CCL. It has the station codes EW8 and CC9 for the EWL and CCL, respectively. As part of the two lines, Paya Lebar station is operated by SMRT Trains. On the EWL, Paya Lebar is adjacent to Eunos and Aljunied stations. As of October 2026, the station's EWL platforms operate from about 5:50 am to 12:20 am on most days with a frequency of 2–5 minutes during peak hours and an average of 5 minutes outside of peak hours. The station is between Dakota and MacPherson stations on the CCL. As of October 2026, Paya Lebar station operates from about 5:30 am to 12:30 am, where train frequencies vary from an average of 2–4 minutes during peak hours to an average of 5–6 minutes for off-peak hours.

Paya Lebar MRT station is located in the Geylang planning area of the Central Region, and is situated on the junction between Paya Lebar Road and Sims Avenue. The station serves multiple nearby malls such as Paya Lebar Square, PLQ mall, SingPost Centre, and Tanjong Katong Complex. Paya Lebar station is also near several religious buildings like the Masjid Wak Tanjong, Madrasah Wak Tanjong Al-Islamiah, Sri Sivan Temple, and Foo Hai Ch'an Monastery.

=== Design ===
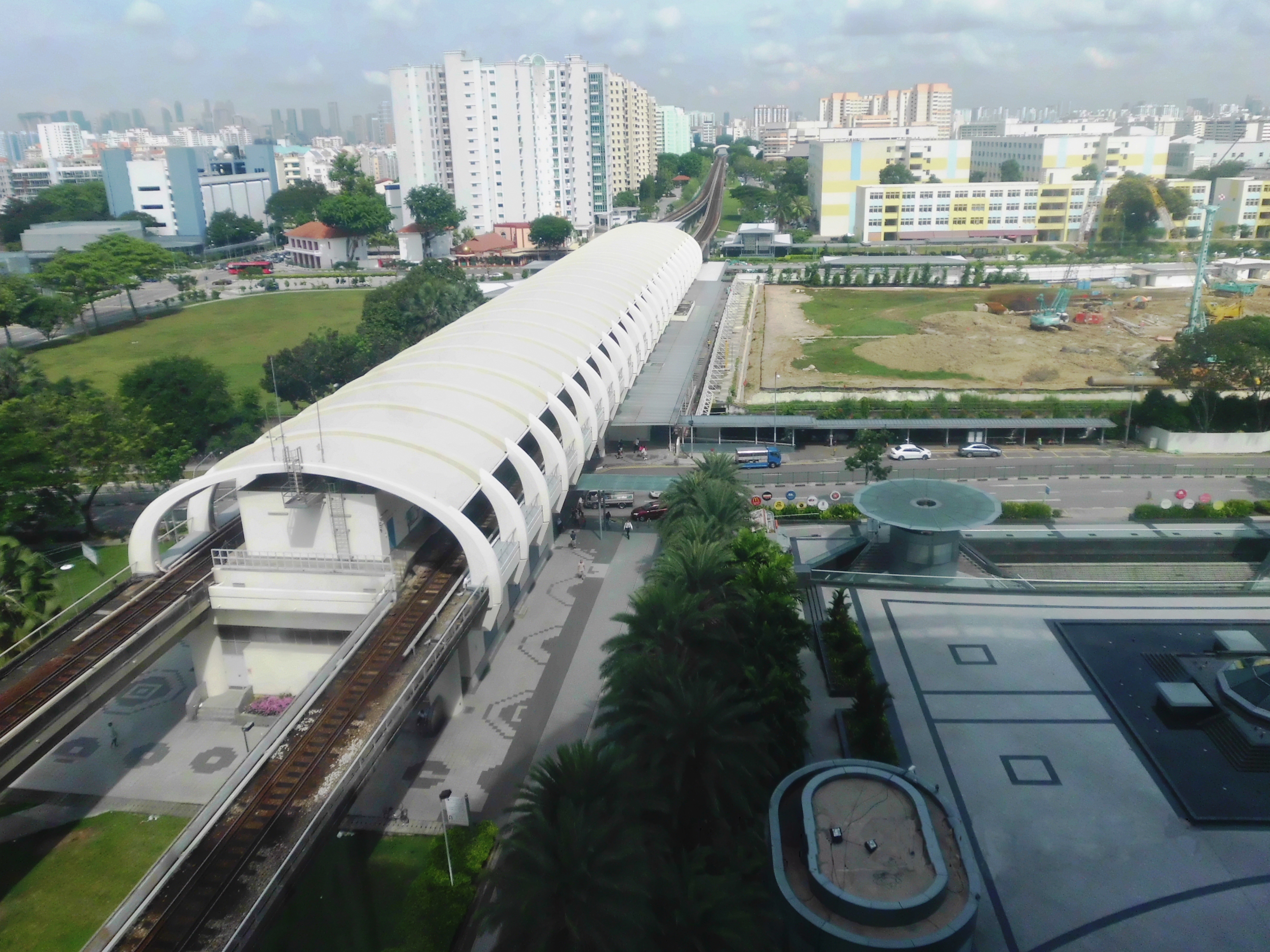
Paya Lebar's EWL station has a dome-shaped roof, which was designed by the MRTC to give the station an "attractive look".

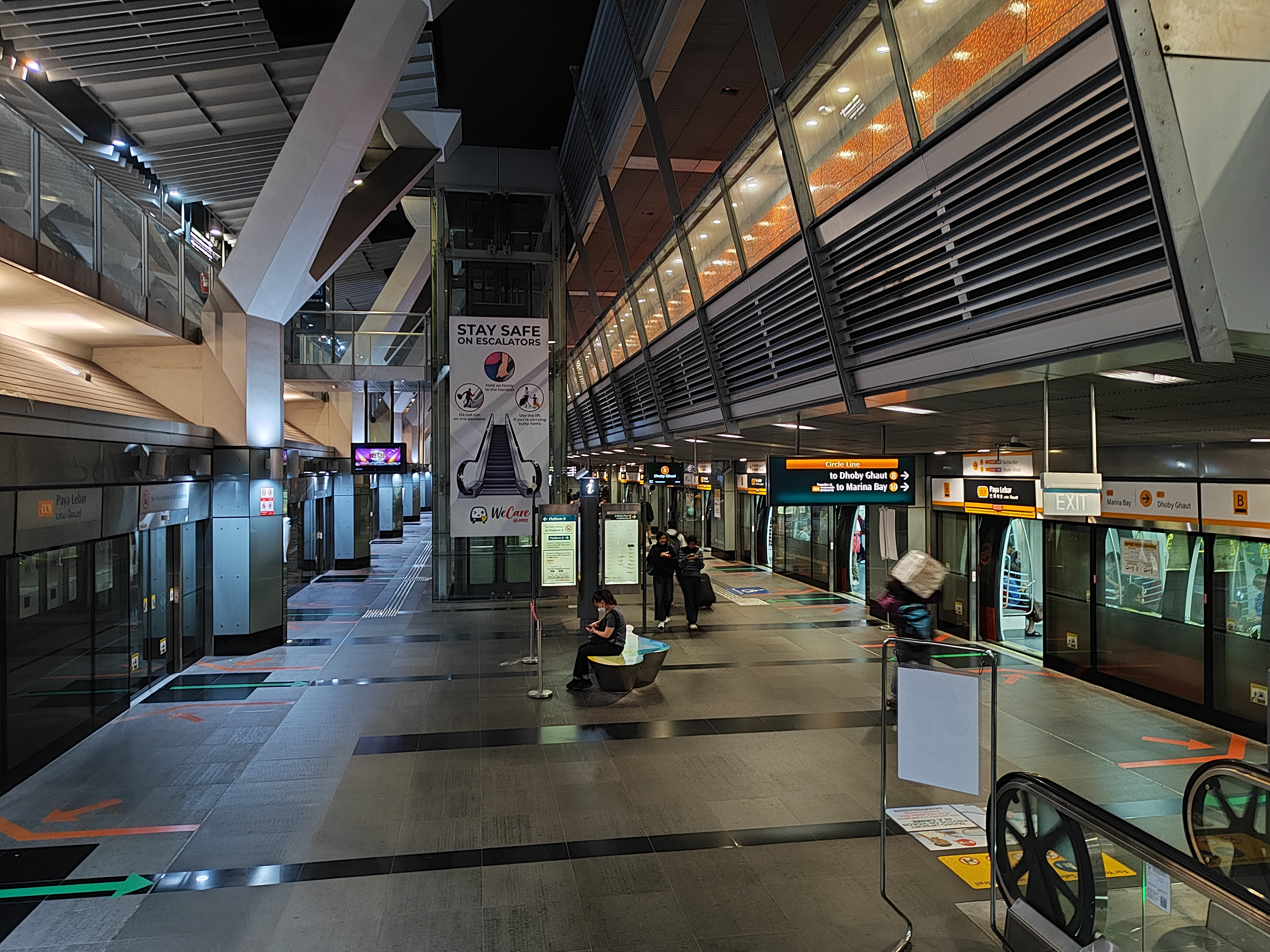
Paya Lebar's CCL station was designed to be "quietly high-tech". The CCL station also features Y-shaped columns.

Paya Lebar was the first interchange station between an elevated and underground rail line in Singapore. The station has bicycle facilities and is wheelchair accessible – wider fare gates allow easier access for wheelchair users into the station. A tactile system of tiles with rounded or elongated raised studs guides visually impaired commuters through the station, with dedicated tactile routes that connect the station entrances to the platforms.

Paya Lebar's EWL station is two-stories tall and elevated. The station's concourse, designed to be column-free, has a ticketing office and the electrical and mechanical plant rooms. Like many stations on the initial MRT network, the station's EWL platforms are in the island platform configuration; the platform level is supported by the columns of the station's rail viaducts and has the signalling and telecommunications room. Similar to most Phase IIA stations, Paya Lebar's EWL station has a dome-shaped roof. (Note: The exception is Eunos, which has a traditional Malay-style roof.) The roof – which spans 23 metres (75 ft) across the platform and tracks – is made of a 7 metres (23 ft) high parabolic arched canopy supported by 25 precast concrete ribs; between each rib is a 15 centimetres (5.9 in) tall roof slab. The design was an attempt by the MRTC to give the stations on the EWL an "attractive look"; The Straits Times has compared it to a caterpillar in one article and a rib cage in another article.

According to the writer Colin Cheong, Paya Lebar's CCL station, like all stations on the line, was designed to look "quietly high-tech" such that it would not become unfashionable in the near future. The CCL stations built during that time also had a standardised layout and architecture to assist commuters with wayfinding. Paya Lebar station is among the few stations with Y-shaped columns that support the station structure. Additionally, there are barrier-free transfers between the Paya Lebar's EWL and CCL sections. Paya Lebar's CCL station, like the other stations on the line, has features such as lifts and wider faregates to make them accessible for wheelchair users.

== Public art ==
Paya Lebar station has three artworks, two of which are part of the Art in Transit programme, a showcase of public artworks on the MRT system.

=== The Signs of Times ===
The artwork The Signs of Times by Salleh Japar is displayed at the CCL part of Paya Lebar station as part of the Art in Transit programme, a showcase of public artworks on the MRT network. The Signs of Times is a 2.8 × 5.6 metres (9.2 × 18.4 feet) mural consisting of multi-coloured icons such as a postman and an aeroplane taking flight, which represent Paya Lebar's history as a communications hub; pictographs that represent historical landmarks such as a lion's head for the Lion City Hotel; and icons that represent aspects of Japar's life, such as a man riding a motorcycle and a hand holding a leaf.

=== Art Seats ===
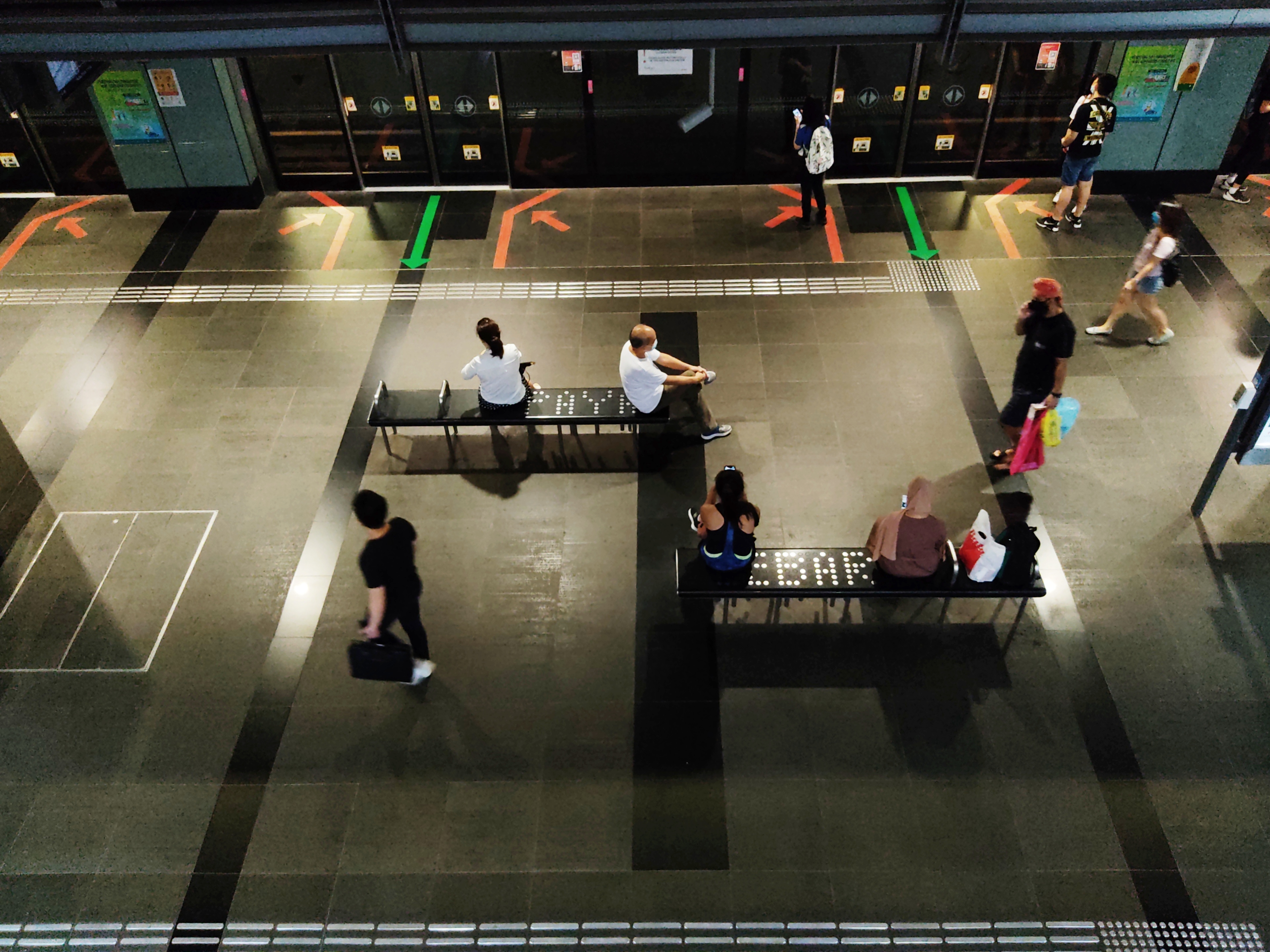
Matrix features the station's name on top of the bench, illustrated in the dot matrix style.

The CCL platforms feature two sets of Art Seats, platform seats that are intended to be works of art and remain functional and practical. The two sets, Matrix and Rain, were designed by Lui Honfay and Yasmine Chan, and were selected through the International Art Seats Design Competition in 2006. Matrix consists of benches engraved with the station name in a dot-matrix style on the seat surface – this pattern was chosen as it was flexible enough to be mass-produced for use in many stations. The intriguing combination of signage and seat in Matrix "impressed" the judges, who awarded it the top prize.

=== The Paya Lebar Story ===
As a part of the heritage-themed Comic Connect public art display by SMRT, a mural entitled The Paya Lebar Story displayed at this station. The mural – created by the local artists Sayed Ismali, James Suresh, and Suki Chong – depicts the Arab merchant Syed Omar Aljunied and landmarks in the Paya Lebar area such as Kampung Melayu, the Sri Sivan Temple, and the former Geylang Fire Station.

== Bibliography ==
=== Books ===
- Cheong, Colin (2012). The Circle Line, Linking All Lines (PDF). Singapore: Land Transport Authority. ISBN 9789814342025. OCLC 743194452.
- Zhuang, Justin; Mead, Andrew; Koh, Hui Ting (2013). Art In Transit: Circle Line MRT — Singapore. Singapore: Land Transport Authority. ISBN 9789810749828.

=== Journals ===
- Copsey, J. P.; Hulme, T. W.; Kraft, B.; Sripathy, P. (1989). "Singapore Mass Rapid Transit System: Design". Proceedings of the Institution of Civil Engineers. 86 (4). doi:10.1680/iicep.1989.2627. ISSN 1753-7789 – via Emerald Insight.
- Hulme, T. W.; Potter, L. A. C.; Shirlaw, J. N. (1989). "Singapore Mass Rapid Transit System: Construction". Proceedings of the Institution of Civil Engineers. 86 (4). doi:10.1680/iicep.1989.2628. ISSN 1753-7789 – via Emerald Insight.
- Richmond, Jonathan E. D. (2008). "Transporting Singapore—the Air‐conditioned Nation". Transport Reviews. 28 (3). doi:10.1080/01441640701722363. ISSN 1464-5327 – via Taylor and Francis.
