= Paya Lebar Office Centre =

Former fire station in Geylang, Singapore

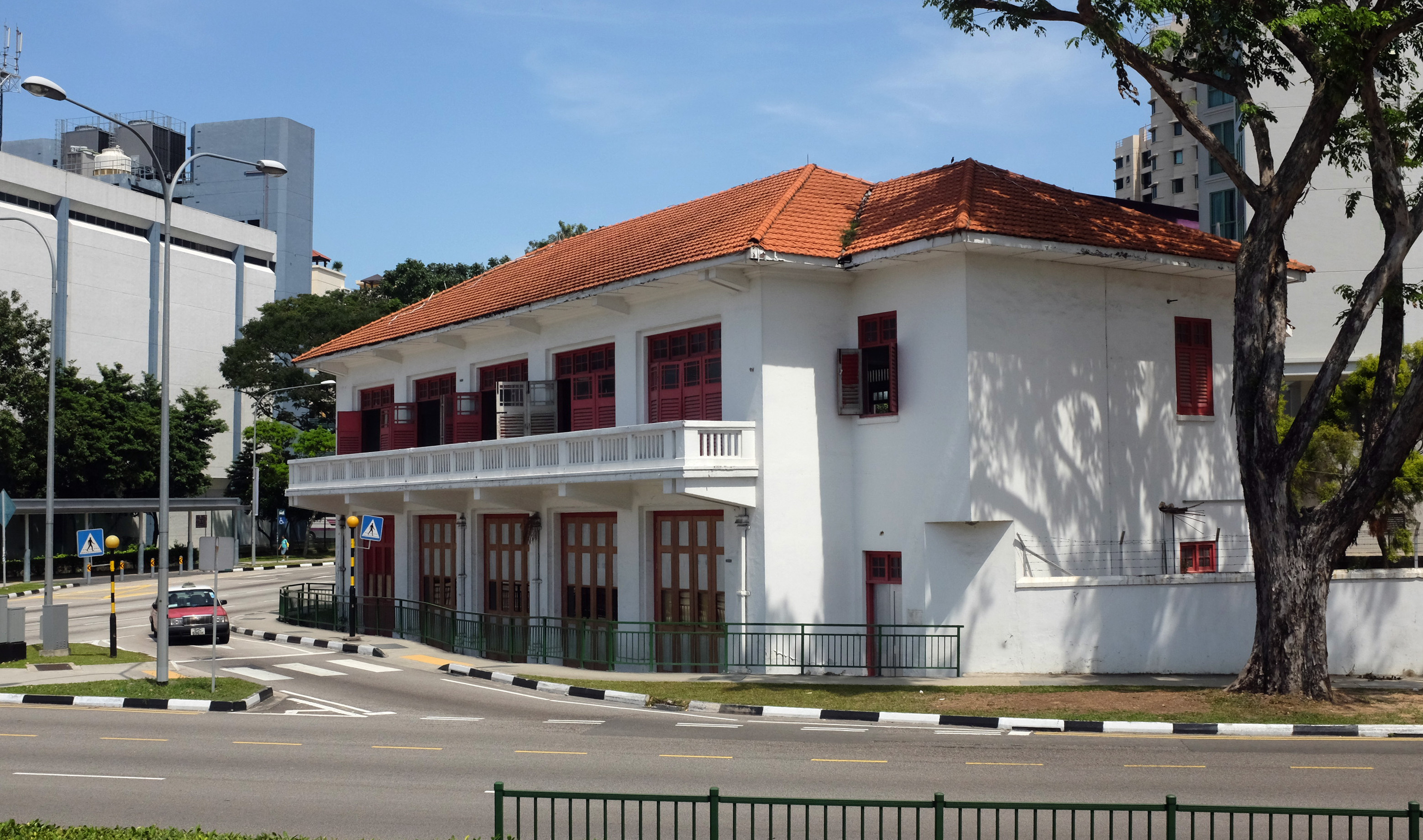
- Interactive map of the Paya Lebar Office Centre area
- Alternative names: Old Geylang Fire Station

General information
- Type: Commercial offices (formerly fire station)
- Architectural style: Art Deco
- Location: 29 Paya Lebar Road, Singapore 409005
- Coordinates: 1.3169697°N 103.8920124°E
- Completed: 1929; 97 years ago
- Owner: Urban Redevelopment Authority

The Paya Lebar Office Centre is an office building located at the junction of Sims Avenue and Paya Lebar Road in Geylang, Singapore. Originally, the building was known as the Geylang Fire Station, operating between 1929 and 2002 before it was converted into an office building in 2015. The building is located next to Masjid Wak Tanjong, a modern mosque that serves residents of the surrounding area.

== History ==
The Singapore Fire Brigade first opened the Geylang Fire Station in 1929. It was the second fire station to be opened in colonial Singapore after the Central Fire Station at Hill Street was opened in 1909, twenty years earlier. As indicated by its name, the Geylang Fire Station was meant to serve the residential area of Geylang, although its service also extended to the Changi, Kallang and Katong areas. In 1939, electric air raid sirens were installed in the station. A musalla and instructional room was also added within the building for Muslim firefighters to perform their daily prayers as well as the Friday prayer while on duty. In 1950, the Geylang Fire Station was officially gazetted as a protected site. After the formation of the Singapore Civil Defence Force (SCDF) in the 1990s, the station went under their management.

In 1982, a marathon was organized by the fire station, which saw at least 2,000 people participating, while firefighters from the station helped to spray water on the participants to cool them down at the end of the marathon. Then in 1999, it was decided that the newly-formed SCDF would be receiving a new headquarters in Paya Lebar, while SCDF Commissioner, James Tan, brought up the possibility of the Geylang Fire Station ceasing operations due to the introduction of this new headquarters. The prospect was eventually confirmed and the Geylang Fire Station ceased operations in May 2002, with all services relocated to the new Paya Lebar Fire Station that was situated along Ubi Avenue. The remaining building was left empty and in 2012 was used as a temporary theatre for a play. In 2015, the building was converted into the Paya Lebar Office Centre, with two offices inside being put up for rent upon the completion of the conversion.

In 2021, the Paya Lebar Office Centre was marked as a heritage site of the Geylang Serai locality. It was also placed under conservation and it has remained a protected site since 2007.

== Architecture ==
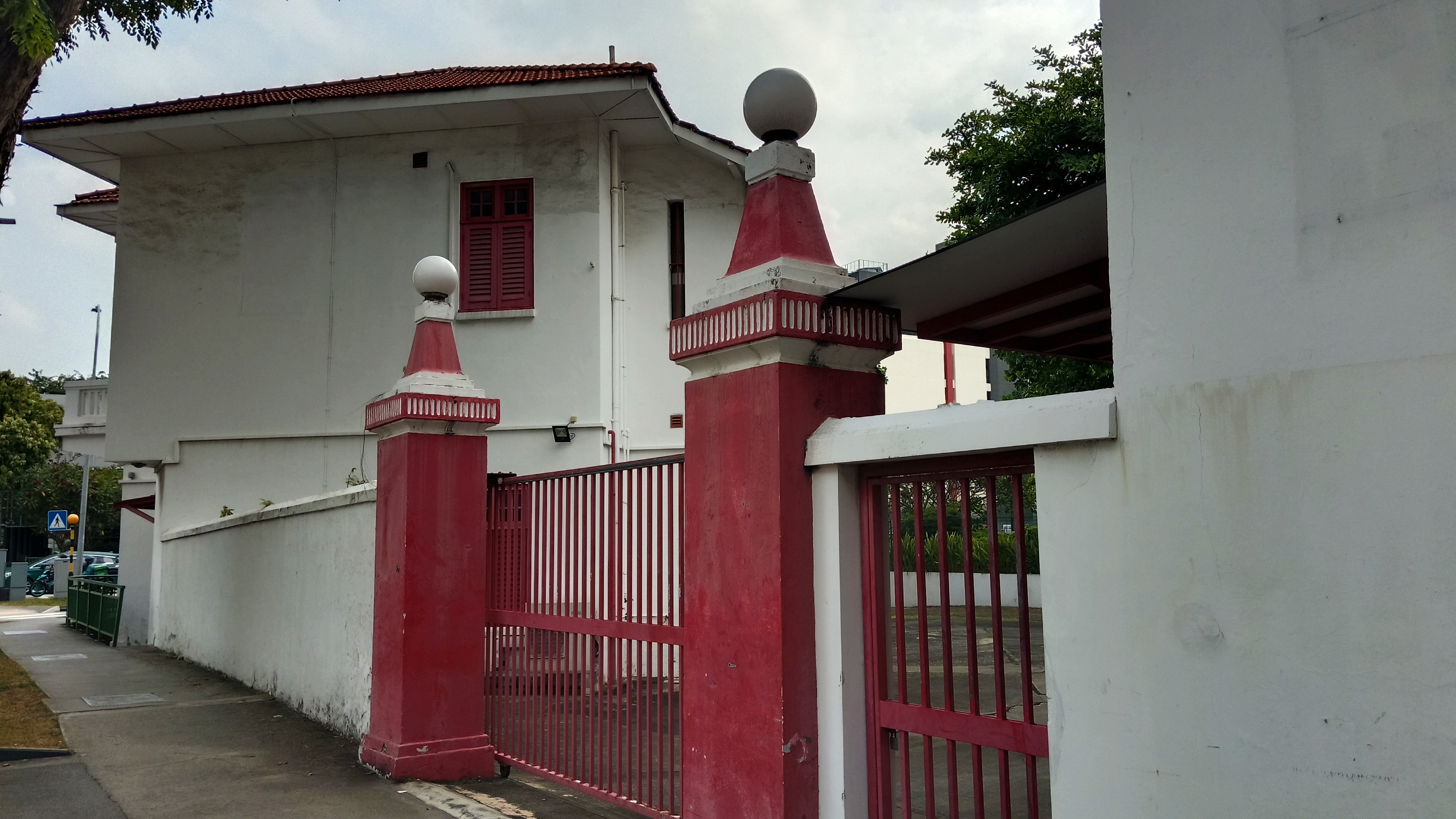
The main entrance of the building that faces Paya Lebar Road.

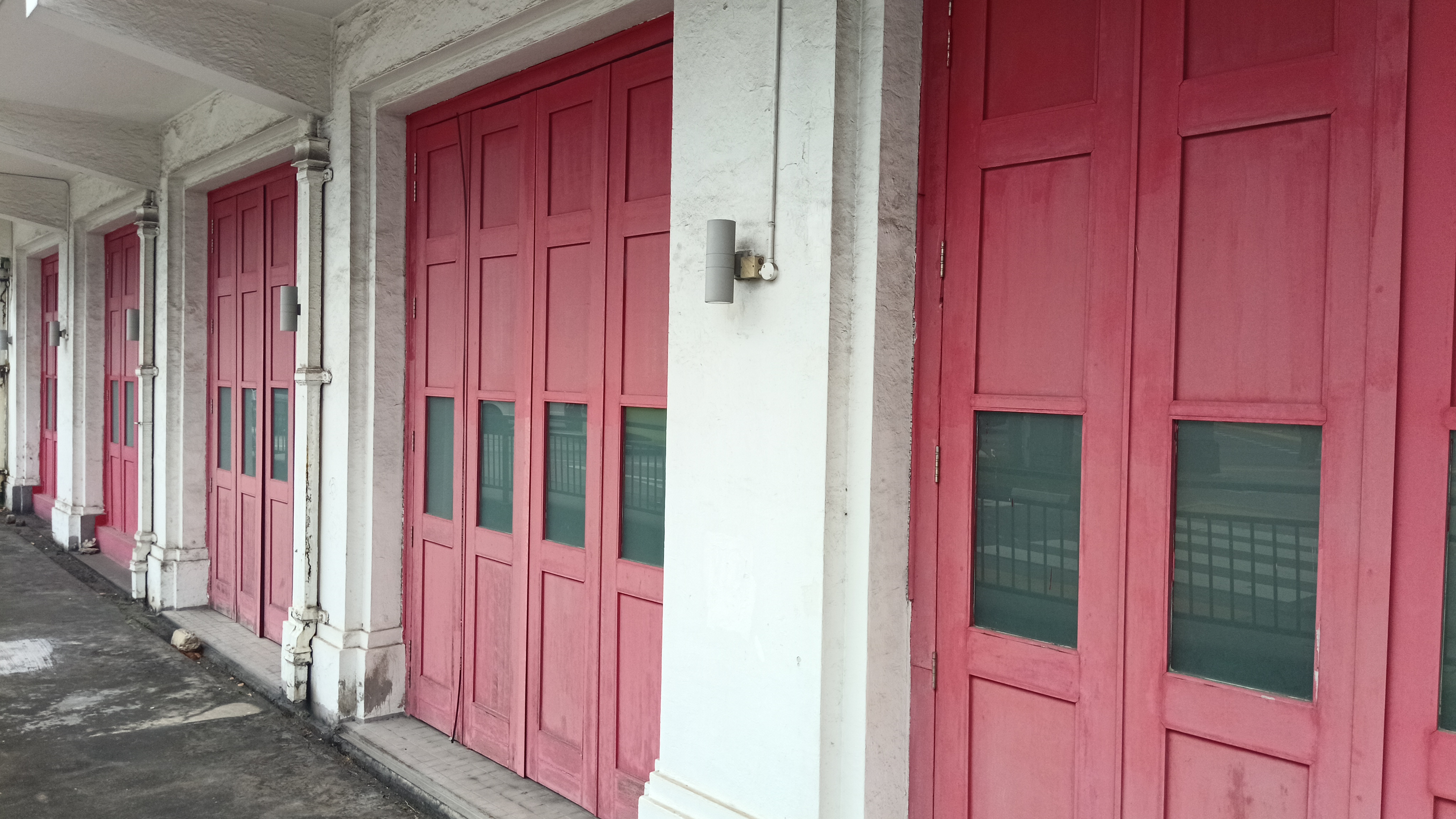
Doors at the facade of the building are painted in red.

The former fire station is a prominent example of Art Deco architecture in the country. The floor-to-floor windows, doors and entrances are all painted red, with the rest of the building being predominately white in colour. The tall ceilings and louvre windows help to ventilate the interior of the building as well as remove excessive heat.

== Transportation ==
The Paya Lebar Office Centre is located directly next to Masjid Wak Tanjong on the same street at the junction of Sims Avenue and Paya Lebar Road, with both buildings being directly accessible from the Paya Lebar MRT Station.

== See also ==
- Geylang
- 49 Moonstone Lane
