= History of the Mass Rapid Transit (Singapore) =

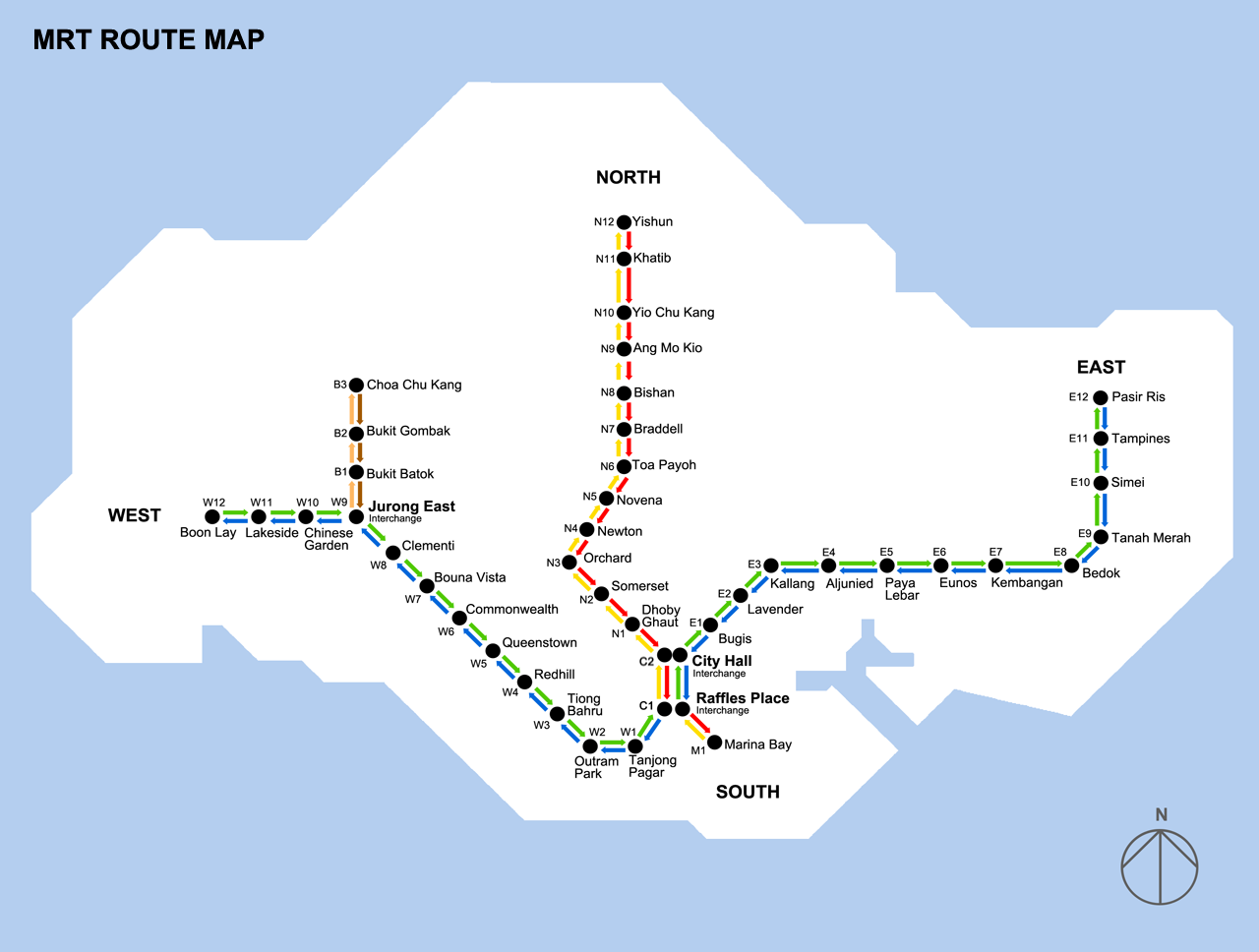
Map of the MRT system during the late 1980s to early 1990s; the Branch Line would merge with the NSL after the completion of the Woodlands Extension in 1996.

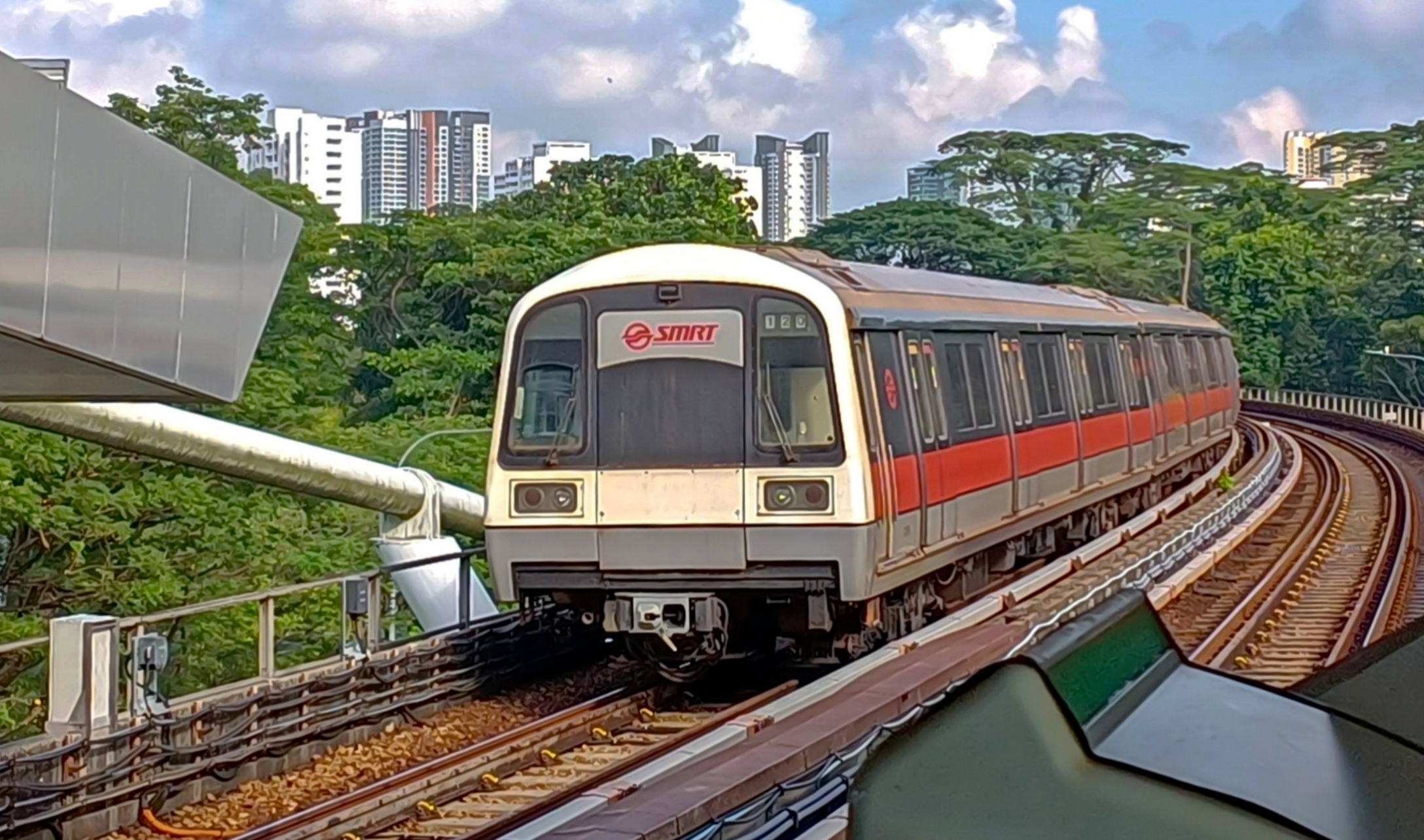
The C151 train, introduced in 1987, was the first-generation electric multiple unit (EMU) rolling stock used on the MRT network. It was fully decommissioned in 2025.

Planning on the Mass Rapid Transit (MRT) system of Singapore began in the 1960s, which finally led to its opening in 1987 with the launch of a 6 km section of the North–South Line (NSL) from Yio Chu Kang to Toa Payoh. Since its inception, the rapid transit system has played a crucial role in the public transportation network and the wider development of the country as a whole, providing a fast and efficient means of transportation for millions of Singaporeans daily.

At the time, it was the largest infrastructure project undertaken by the country during its early days of independence, and when completed was the first such metro system in Southeast Asia. The only choices of public transport available in Singapore during the 1960s were buses, taxis and trishaws and the lack of seamless connectivity of the public transport system resulted in long and inconvenient journeys throughout the country. The idea for a rapid transit system in Singapore was first mooted in the late 1960s. The government recognised the need for a comprehensive public transportation system to accommodate the country's growing population. Debates and feasibility studies were carried out throughout the 1970s and 1980s.

In 1982, the MRT was greenlit and the government established the Mass Rapid Transit Corporation (MRTC) to oversee the construction and operation of the MRT system. The construction of the MRT system, which began in 1983, was a massive undertaking. The first section, known as the North–South Line (NSL), began construction in 1983. The line opened in stages, with the first section from Yio Chu Kang to Toa Payoh commencing operation on 7 November 1987.

Following the opening of the NSL, subsequent lines were constructed, including the East-West Line (EWL) which began operation in 1989. Over the years, more lines and extensions were added, including the North East Line (NEL), Circle Line (CCL), and infill stations added to existing lines. In 2000, the MRTC was privatised, and two companies were formed – SMRT Corporation, which is responsible for operating the NSL, EWL, CCL and the Thomson–East Coast Line (TEL), and SBS Transit, which is responsible for operating the NEL and the Downtown Line (DTL). Since the 2010s, it was semi-renationalised into a hybrid regulatory framework; construction and procurement would fall under the purview of the Land Transport Authority (LTA), a statutory board of the government that allocates operating concessions, with these companies responsible for asset maintenance on their respective lines.

Since the 2000s and beyond, the government has continued to invest heavily in the expansion and improvement of the MRT system. Newer lines such as the DTL and the TEL were constructed throughout the 2010s and 2020s, extending the reach of the network and to cover additional parts of the country. Throughout the years, the MRT system has also undergone various upgrades to enhance safety, efficiency, and passenger comfort. Of these, they include the implementation of new signaling systems which has allowed for shorter headways, the addition of platform screen doors (PSDs), the introduction of more spacious and modern trains, as well as stations being retrofitted or constructed with facilities catered towards the elderly or people with disabilities.

As of July 2026, the network has six operational lines with a total combined route length of approximately 242.6 km (150.7 mi) and 146 operational stations. Two additional lines and 42 stations are currently under construction, namely the Jurong Region Line (JRL) and the Cross Island Line (CRL). The MRT system is integrated with other modes of public transportation in Singapore, such as buses and light rail systems which act as a feeder service to the MRT network; the latter is known as the Light Rail Transit (LRT), which first opened in 1999.

== Construction of backbone network ==
=== Conceptualisation ===
The idea of constructing a rapid transit line in the country was initiated in 1967 when a four-year State and City Planning Study was conducted by the Singapore government and the United Nations Development Programme. It was part of an urban renewal and development project which aimed to formulate a long-term comprehensive concept plan for guiding the country's future physical development. It was concluded that physical land constraints faced by the island nation, were not able to accommodate more roads to meet the rise in transportation demands. It was noted that the country needed a rail transit system by 1992.

=== Bus vs. rail debate ===
It took 10 years from 1972 to design the MRT system, which continued all the way until the government gave permission to build the MRT.

When future president Ong Teng Cheong became the then-Minister for Communications (now the Ministry of Transport), he had to convince the cabinet in a debate in early 1980, that the S$5 billion needed for the system would be beneficial for the long-term development of Singapore. He argued that:

This is going to be the most expensive single project to be undertaken in Singapore. The last thing that we want to do is to squander away our hard-earned reserves and leave behind enormous debt for our children and our grandchildren. Now since we are sure that this is not going to be the case, we'll proceed with the MRT, and the MRT will usher in a new phase in Singapore's development and bring about a better life for all of us.

— Ong Teng Cheong

Therefore, a provisional Mass Rapid Transit Authority was established in July 1980, after the debate. However, Ong faced strong opposition from other members of the cabinet, including Finance Minister Goh Keng Swee and Tony Tan, due especially to the heavy investments involved. A team of specialists from Harvard University, recommended that an all-bus system would be sufficient into the 1990s, and would cost 50% less than a rail-based system.

Later on, two independent American transport and urban planning specialist teams were then appointed by the government to conduct their own independent reviews as part of the Comprehensive Traffic Study in 1981. This debate was also brought to national television in September 1980, which was rare at that time. The study came to the conclusion that an all-bus system would be inadequate as it would have to compete for road space which would have been increasingly overcrowded by then. The problem would be solved by building a rail system. Ong hence declared in triumph on 28 May 1982, that:

The Government has now taken a firm decision to build the MRT. The MRT is much more than a transport investment and must be viewed from its wider economic perspective. The boost'll provide to long term investors' confidence, the multiplier effect and how MRT will lead to the enhancement of the intrinsic value of Singapore's real estate are spin-offs that cannot be ignored."

— Ong Teng Cheong

=== Construction begins ===
The permission to begin the construction of Singapore's then-largest public works project was given in May 1982. A ground-breaking ceremony commenced the construction on 22 October 1983 at Shan Road. The majority of the work was expected to be completed in 1992. This included 67 kilometres (42 miles) of track to be constructed, with 42 stations, of which 26 would be elevated, 1 at grade and 15 underground. The network was constructed in stages, with the North–South Line given priority as the line passed through the Orchard Road corridor as well as the rest of the Central Area, the latter of which faced high demand for public transport. Also, it was near the more densely populated housing estates such as Toa Payoh and Ang Mo Kio. The MRT Corporation, now Land Transport Authority, was established on 14 October 1983, taking over the roles and responsibilities of the former provisional Mass Rapid Transit Authority. On 6 August 1987, it set up SMRT Corporation.

Construction began in various areas:

- October 1983: Yio Chu Kang – Outram Park (Phase I)
- January 1984: Outram Park – Clementi (Phase IA)
- July 1984: Clementi – Lakeside (Phase II)
- January 1985: Marina Bay – Tanah Merah (Phase II)
- June 1985: Tanah Merah – Pasir Ris, Jurong East – Choa Chu Kang & Yio Chu Kang – Yishun (Phase II)
- January 1988: Lakeside – Boon Lay (Phase II)

Toa Payoh MRT station was the first to do structural works, followed by the tunnels between Outram Park and Tiong Bahru in 1985. The completion of the viaduct for Phase 1 was done on 15 December 1986 at Commonwealth MRT station. The first C151 train was delivered to MRT Corporation on 8 July 1986, by Yeo Ning Hong at Bishan Depot.

One-third of the MRT was completed on 15 January 1985, and the Minister for Communications and Information Yeo Ning Hong visited Orchard MRT and Dhoby Ghaut MRT station sites. The pouring of concrete was completed by the end of 1985 at Dhoby Ghaut MRT station.

=== Initial opening ===
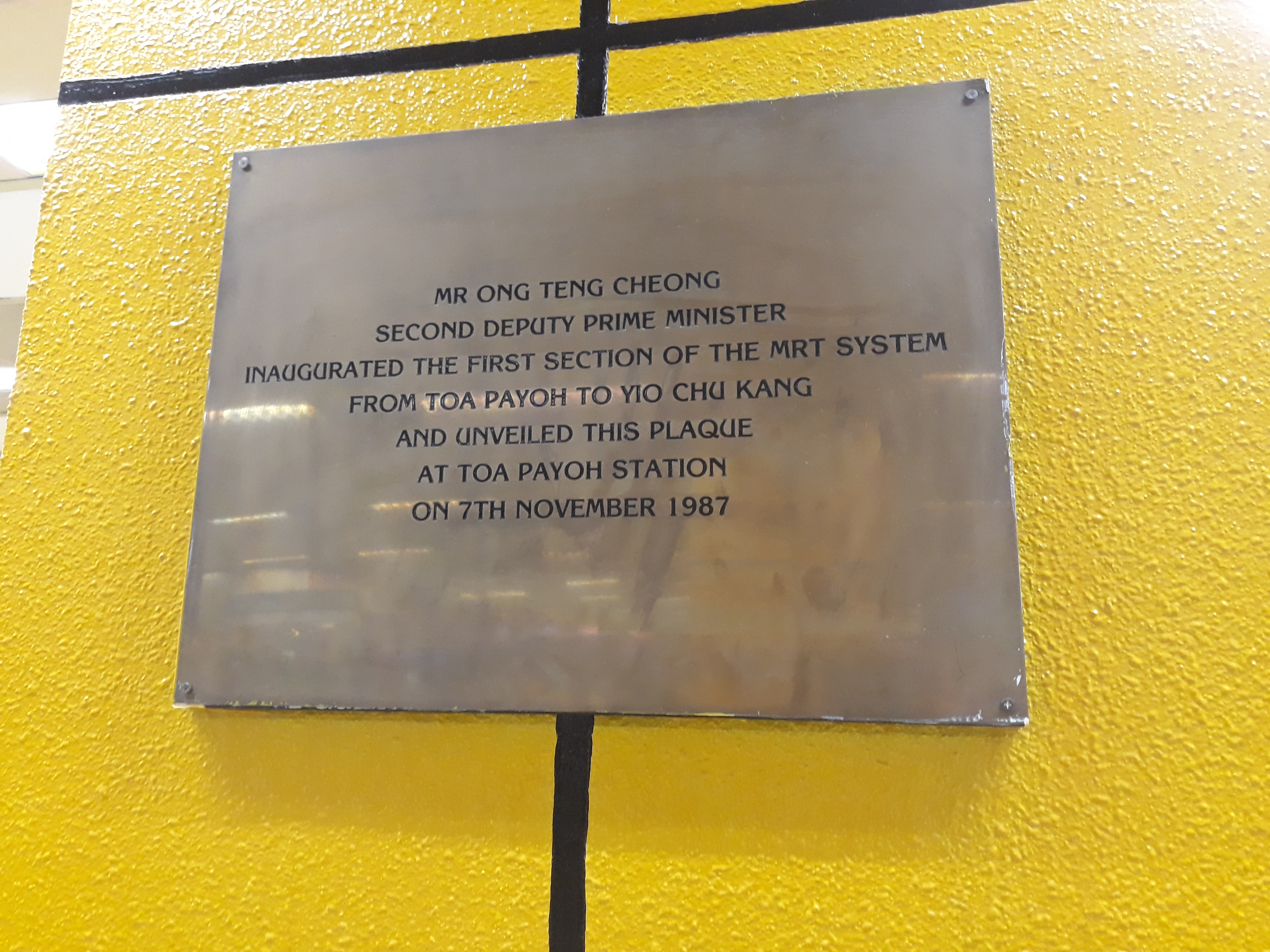
A plaque at the station commemorating the opening of the first phase of the Singapore MRT

On 7 November 1987, the first 6 kilometres of the North–South Line from Yio Chu Kang to Toa Payoh went into operation.

The novelty resulted in thousands flocking to the 5 station segment of the line just to experience and try out the system. At the launching of Toa Payoh, Ong was quoted as saying that

This is like a 20-year affair from conception to delivery. Now the baby is born, to say that I am happy and pleased is an understatement.

— Ong Teng Cheong

Nine more stations from Novena to Outram Park were officially opened 12 December 1987 by then Deputy Prime Minister Goh Chok Tong. These trains ran as a through service from one end to the other even though Tanjong Pagar and Outram Park were on the East–West Line.

On 12 March 1988, six more stations from Tiong Bahru to Clementi on the East–West Line were opened; trains now ran directly from Yio Chu Kang through the city to Clementi. On the same day, the system was officially launched by the late Mr Lee Kuan Yew, then Prime Minister of Singapore.

=== Nearing completion ===
The opening of the MRT network from 1987 to 1990

The rest of the system opened rapidly in stages. On 6 July 1990, with the last station opened, the entire system was opened by President Wee Kim Wee.

Date	Stations	Note
5 November 1988	Jurong East, Chinese Garden, Lakeside (from Clementi)	
20 December 1988	Khatib, Yishun (from Yio Chu Kang)	
4 November 1989	Marina Bay (from Raffles Place)	Through train services between the "North" and "West" of the network ended with the opening of the "East".
4 November 1989	Bugis, Lavender, Kallang, Aljunied, Paya Lebar, Eunos, Kembangan, Bedok, Tanah Merah (from City Hall)	Through train services between the "North" and "West" of the network ended with the opening of the "East".
16 December 1989	Simei, Tampines, Pasir Ris (from Tanah Merah)	
10 March 1990	Bukit Batok, Bukit Gombak, Choa Chu Kang (from Jurong East)	
6 July 1990	Boon Lay (from Lakeside)	

== Subsequent expansions ==
=== Woodlands Extension ===
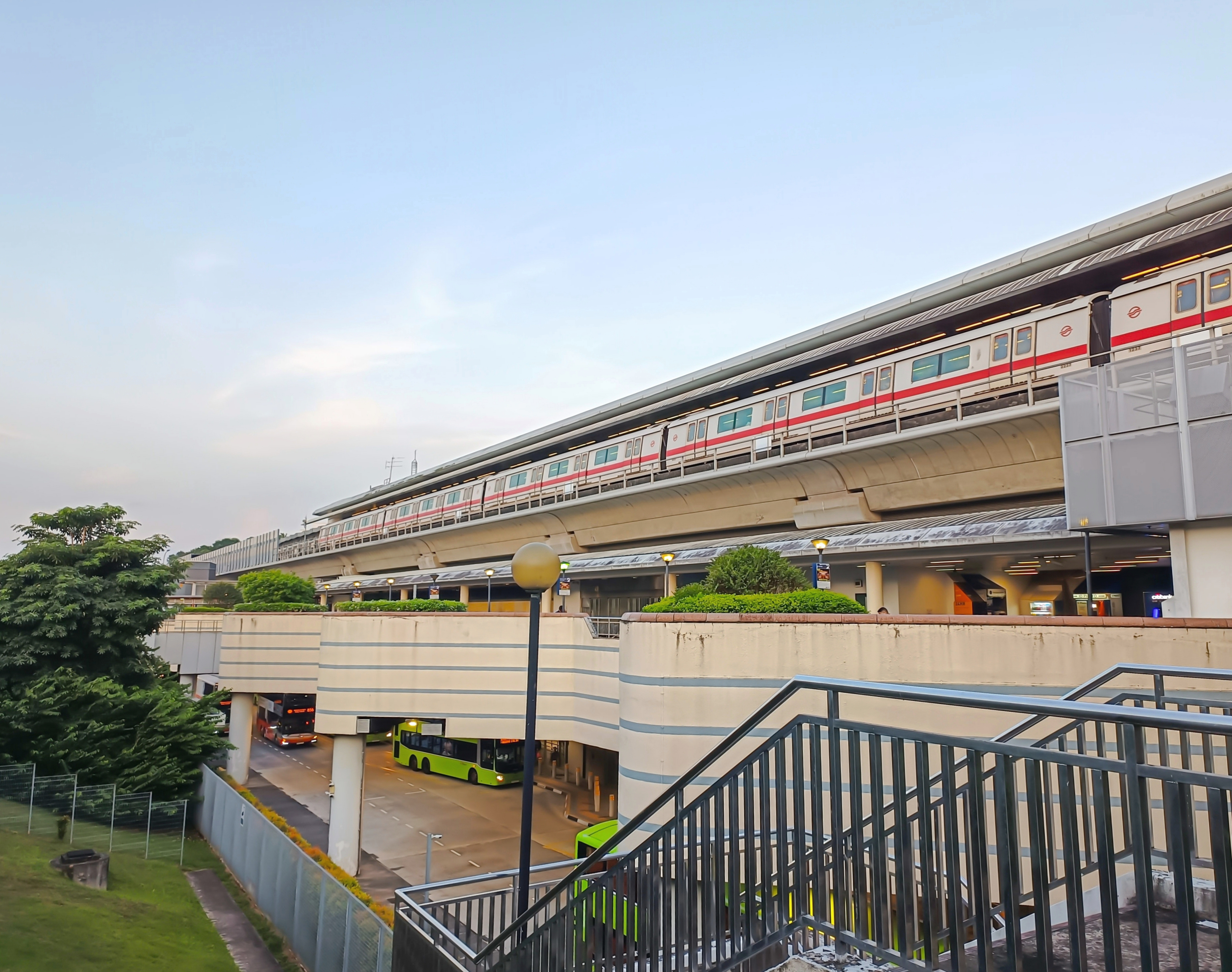
Woodlands is a station built part of the Woodlands Extension together with Woodlands Regional Bus Interchange, located under the station.

Less than a year after the completion of the MRT project, the government announced in February 1991, intentions to extend the system to Woodlands in the north of Singapore. Construction commenced in 1993, and the 16 km, 6 station elevated line was opened on 10 February 1996 at a total cost of S$1.2 billion. With this kind extension, the North–South Line included the three stations on the former Choa Chu Kang Branch line (Jurong East, Bukit Batok, Bukit Gombak and Choa Chu Kang), forming a continuous line from Jurong East to Marina Bay.

The construction of the extension was not without political fallout. For a long time, the politicians representing residences in the north-east area of the country had been calling for the construction of a planned North East Line (NEL). The announcement of the Woodlands Extension led to protests, especially from opposition members of parliament, in particular Chiam See Tong of the Singapore Democratic Party and Low Thia Khiang of the Workers' Party. As the MPs of the Potong Pasir and Hougang constituencies respectively, both areas would've majorly benefitted from such a line. They accused the People's Action Party government of favouring the Woodlands Extension over the NEL due to opposition representation in the north-east area, arguing that there were far more residents there compared to the north, and questioned the rationale of building the Woodlands extension when the north was then relatively undeveloped.

=== Dover station ===
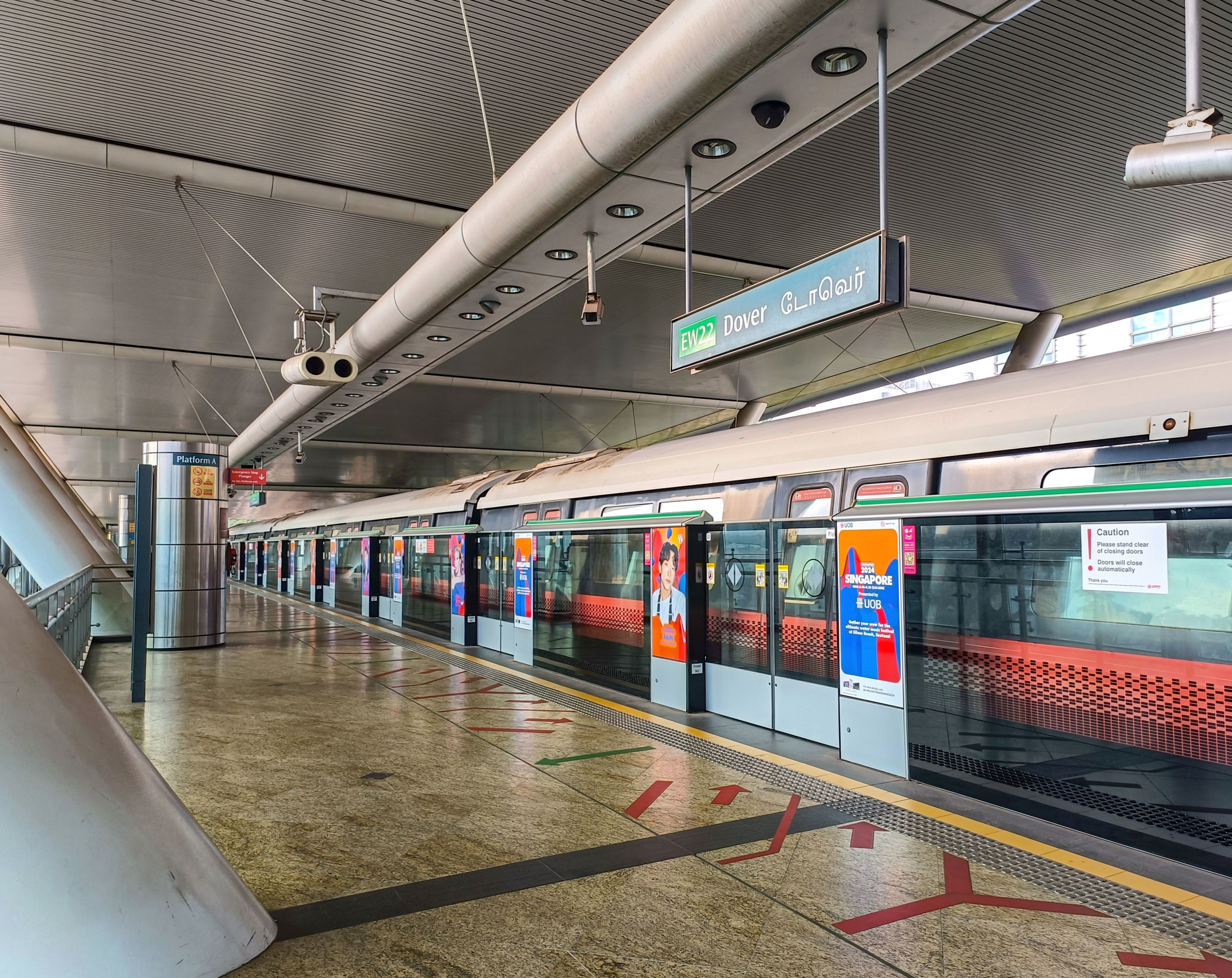
Dover MRT station, the first MRT station to be built along an existing rail line.

Dover, built on the East–West Line between Clementi and Buona Vista, was officially opened on 23 October 2001 by then Minister for Transport, Mr Yeo Cheow Tong, being open for service on 18 October 2001. The first station to be built over an operating rail line with no disruptions to train services (although trains drove by the site at a reduced speed during the construction phase), it was also the first elevated station with two side platforms on either side of the tracks, as opposed to having an island platform as in all other elevated stations.

Adjacent to the Singapore Polytechnic on one side, and undeveloped land on the other, the building of the station was met with reservations by some members of the public over its low catchment area. There were criticisms over the spending of "taxpayers' money" chiefly for use only by students of one educational institution. The government proceeded with the construction anyway, citing the catchment area extends to public housing flats on either end of the polytechnic, and that the undeveloped land opposite is slated for extensive development, largely residential in nature. This station has indeed brought much convenience to the students at the polytechnic.

=== Changi Airport Extension ===
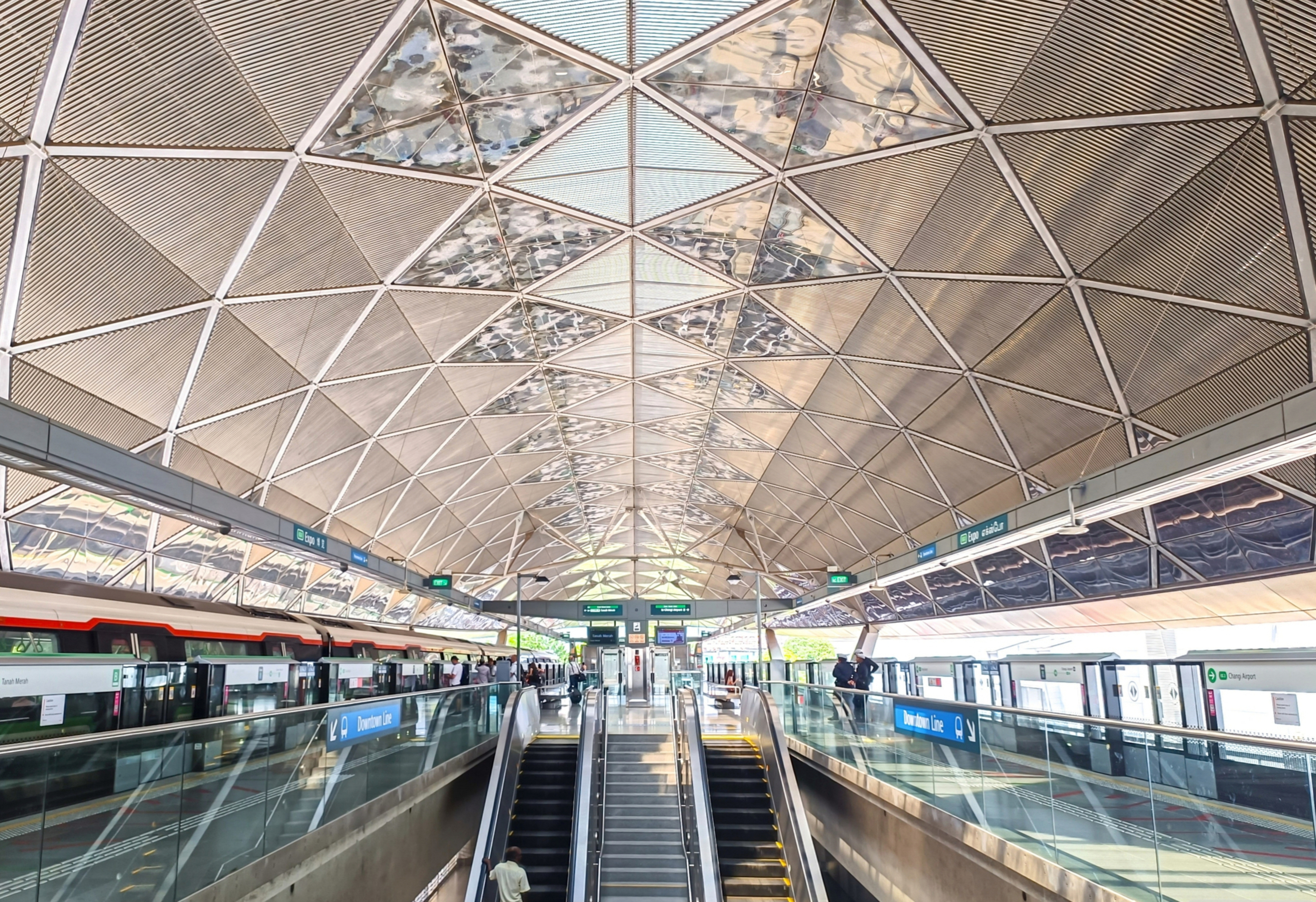
Platforms of Expo station on the Changi Airport extension, which connected Singapore's main international airport to the wider MRT network.

For a long time following its opening in 1981, Singapore Changi Airport relied on taxis and buses as the primary means of public transportation to the rest of the country. They served the airport well, but concerns over competition from other regional airports, some of which feature quick rail-based services to their city centres, accelerated the government's plan to build a rail link to the airport.

Provision had long been made for a new line branching off from the existing East–West Line at the Tanah Merah, with some conceptual plans showing a tentative route alignment to the airport along Airport Boulevard, continuing beyond the airport to Changi Point, before turning southwest back toward the city along the east coast of the island. The plans were finally announced by then Deputy Prime Minister Lee Hsien Loong on 15 November 1996. However, the route alignment showed a deviation from previous plans.

The final plan involved building only the first two stations, namely Expo, an elevated station directly adjacent to the Singapore Expo, and Changi Airport, an underground station built between Terminal Two and the since constructed Terminal Three. The alignment of the station at the airport was switched perpendicularly to an east–west direction, such that stairs and escalators lead to two of the terminals directly from either end of the station. Construction began in December 1998.

Expo opened on 10 January 2001, sporting a "space age" architecture designed by world-renowned architect Sir Norman Foster. The roof is clad in titanium and its design enabled the platform to be free of any columns, freeing up space in a station which will be used by thousands of visitors to the massive 100,000 square metre Singapore Expo next door.

Changi Airport was opened on 8 February 2002, giving the airport its first rail link after less than 21 years of operations. Initially through services were operated from the airport to Boon Lay at the other end of the East–West Line, however due to ridership falling below expectations the service was reverted to shuttle mode in 2003.

=== North East Line ===
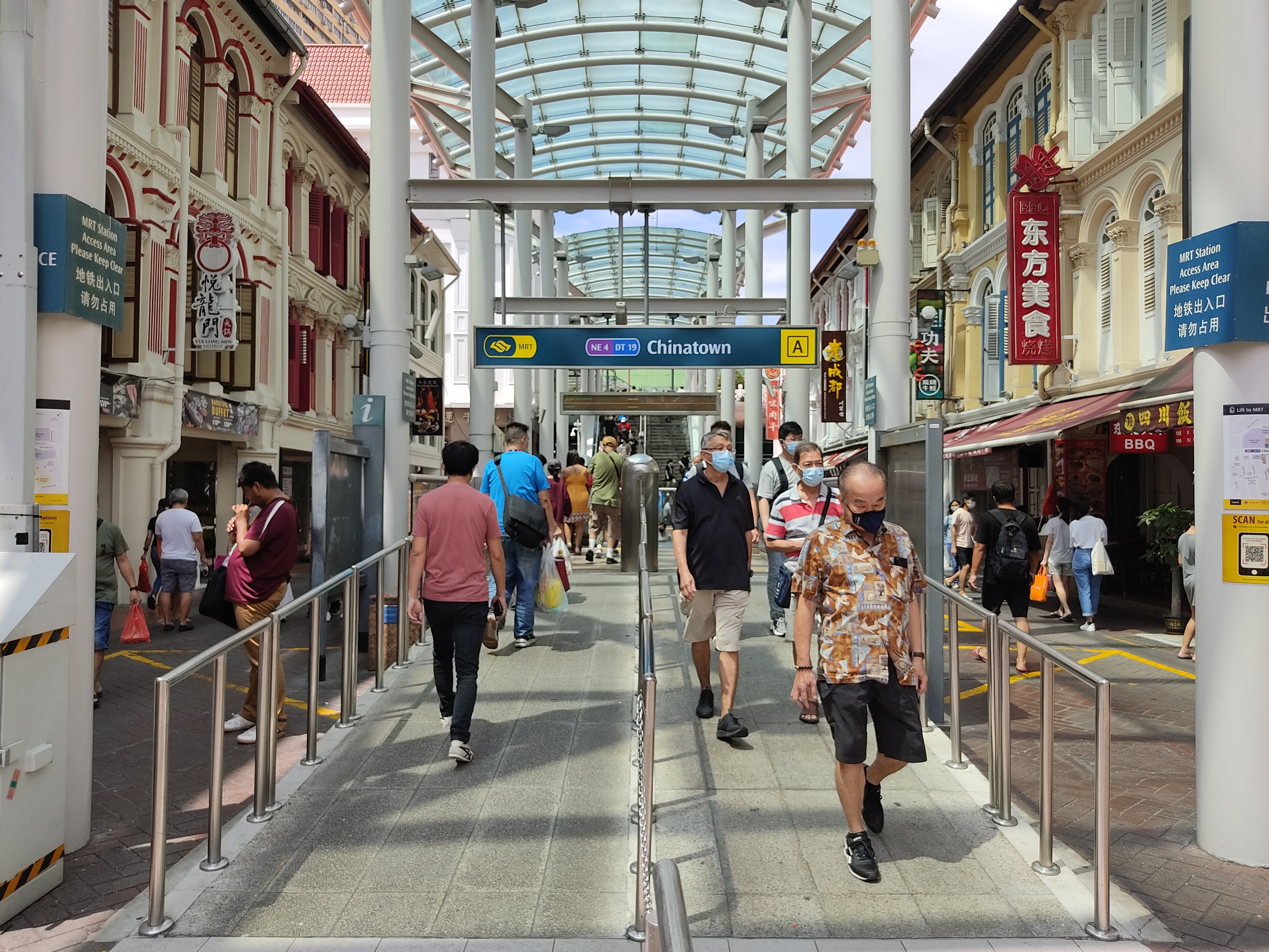
The entrance to Chinatown MRT station at street level: the completion of the North East Line allowed the prominent ethnic neighbourhood of Chinatown to be connected by rail to the rest of Singapore's towns for the first time.

The North East Line, the first line operated by SBS Transit and among the first fully automated heavy rail lines in the world, opened on 20 June 2003, except for Woodleigh and Buangkok stations. System problems delayed the line six months from the scheduled opening date of December 2002. The construction period of the North East Line was fraught with many delays and some budget problems. It marked the pinnacle of a long and chequered history of over two decades since the conception of the line had taken place along with that of the original system which was eventually completed in 1990.

Up to May 2005, the line was running at a deficit, although line operator SBS Transit managed a yearly overall profit as profits from its public bus service exceeded the losses from its operation of the North East Line. Running from HarbourFront where Singapore's former World Trade Centre building lies to Punggol to the northeast of the island, this line allowed for previously isolated or distanced areas to be linked up with the rest of Singapore by rail. Buangkok opened on 15 January 2006 and Woodleigh opened on 20 June 2011.

=== Circle Line ===
On 28 May 2009, 5.6 km of the Circle Line opened from Bartley to Marymount. On 17 April 2010, another 11.1 km of the Circle Line from Bartley to Dhoby Ghaut commenced operation. On 8 October 2011, the remaining 16.6 km from Marymount to HarbourFront commenced operation, marking the full completion of the line which took 10 years to complete, primarily delayed due to the Nicoll Highway collapse. On 14 January 2012, the 2.4 km of the Circle Line extension from Promenade to Marina Bay commenced operation.

=== Downtown Line ===
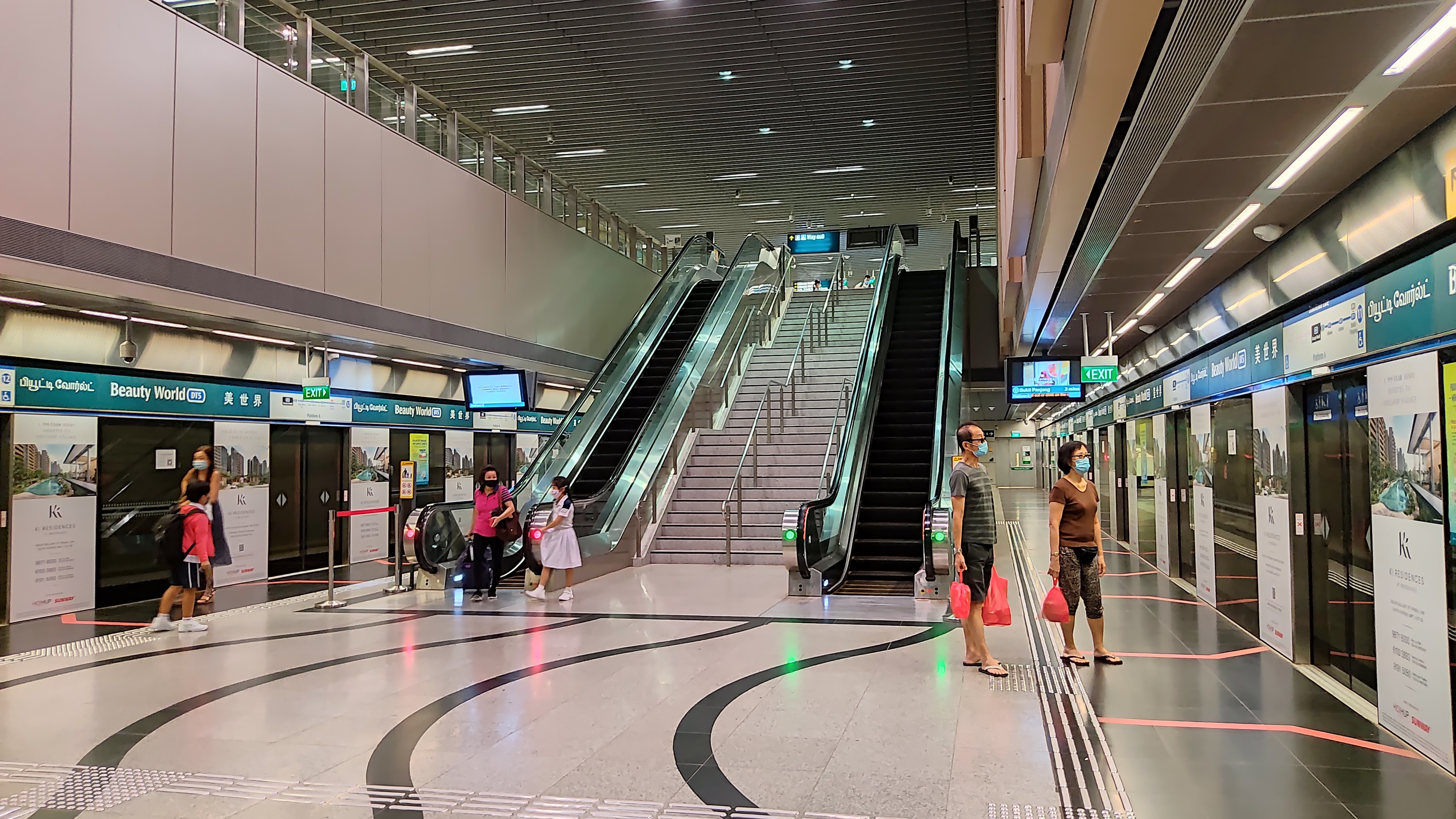
Platforms of Beauty World station on the Downtown Line.

The Downtown Line is the fifth Mass Rapid Transit line in Singapore and opened in three stages, on 22 December 2013, 27 December 2015 and 21 October 2017 respectively. When fully completed, the line will be about 44 km (27 mi) long with 36 stations and serve about half a million commuters daily, making it the longest underground and driverless MRT line in Singapore. Travelling from one end to the other will take about 65 minutes.

On 15 August 2014, the Downtown Line 3 Extension was announced, in conjunction with the announcement of the Thomson–East Coast Line. Two additional stations, Xilin MRT station and Sungei Bedok MRT station will be added to the Downtown Line, with Sungei Bedok as an interchange station with the Thomson–East Coast Line. It will add an additional 2.2 km to the line with the extension. Due in 2026, Stage 3 will join the current East–West and future Thomson–East Coast Lines that runs through Marine Parade.

=== Thomson–East Coast Line ===
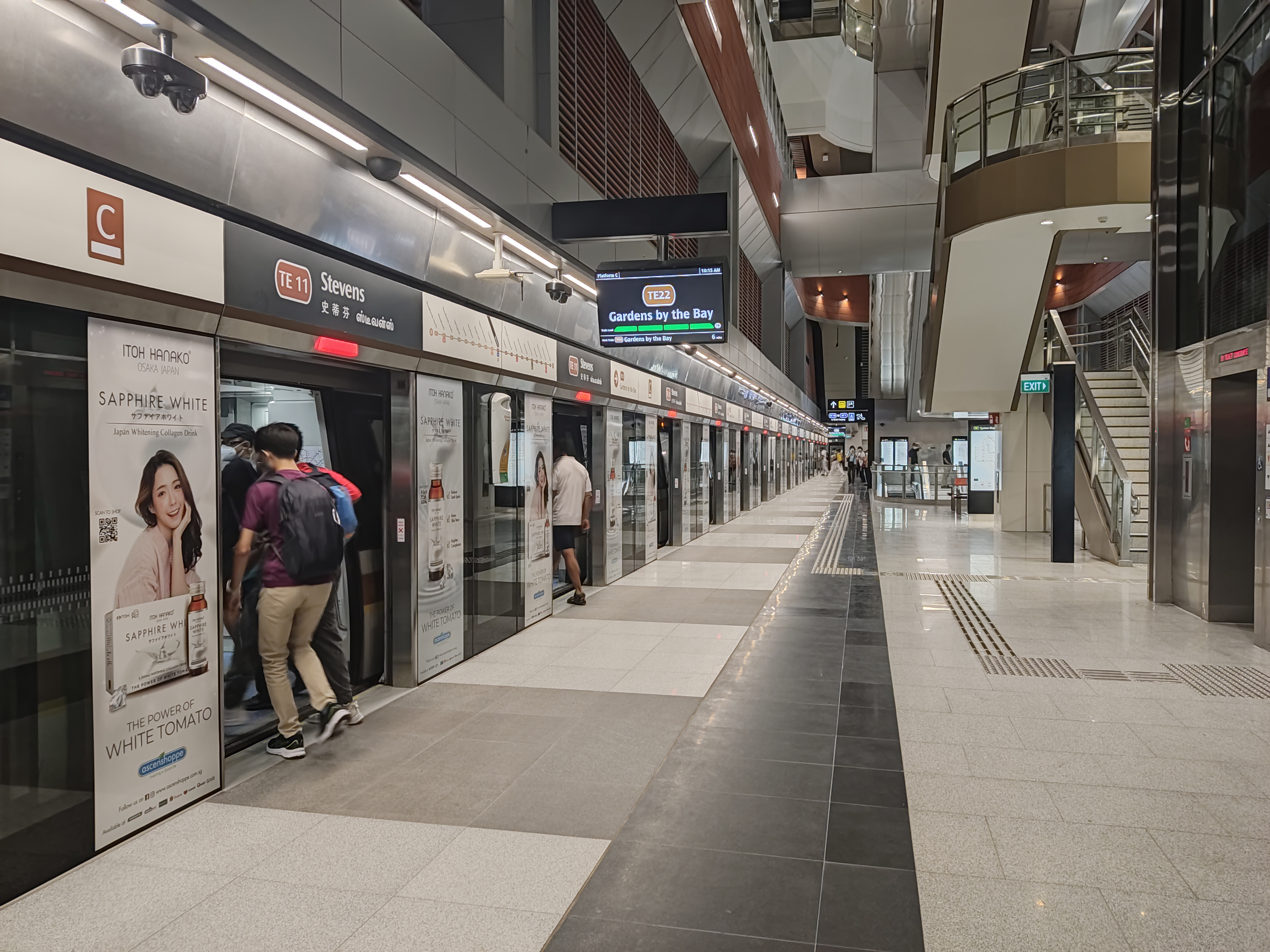
Platforms of Stevens station on the Thomson–East Coast Line.

On 31 January 2020, Stage 1 of the Thomson–East Coast Line between Woodlands North and Woodlands South stations commenced operations. On 28 August 2021, Stage 2 of the line between Woodlands South and Caldecott stations commenced operations. On 13 November 2022, Stage 3 of the line between Caldecott and Gardens by the Bay commenced operations. By June 2024, train services extended to Bayshore. On 23 June 2024, Stage 4 of the line between Tanjong Rhu and Bayshore commenced operations.

=== Other extensions ===
On 28 February 2009, the 3.8 kilometre Boon Lay Extension to the East–West Line comprising 2 stations Pioneer and Joo Koon commenced passenger service. Construction had begun in December 2004 after the development of Pioneer New Town had been completed. Similarly, construction began for the Marina South Pier in December 2009 and completed in September 2014, it began operations on 23 November 2014.

The 7.5 kilometre Tuas West Extension (TWE) – Gul Circle, Tuas Crescent, Tuas West Road and Tuas Link – opened for passenger service on 18 June 2017.

A 1.6 kilometres (0.99 miles) extension to Punggol Coast on the North East Line opened on 10 December 2024.

== History of the system map ==
Schematic map of the Mass Rapid Transit (MRT) and Light Rail Transit (LRT) network in Singapore (an official version can be found at the Land Transport Authority's website).

=== 1987 to 1996 ===
The MRT was a very recent addition for Singapore and as such, the authorities wanted to keep the MRT map as easy to use for Singaporeans as possible. Hence, each direction of travel was colour-coded in a different colour as though it were a line on its own. In that way, confusion in decision-making when taking a certain line in a certain direction would be reduced for passengers. However, this reduced the number of colours available for new lines and was not in line with international practice.

Previously, each direction of travel on the MRT was denoted on system maps as a different colour.

- Northbound services were denoted in yellow ( )
- Southbound services in red ( )
- Eastbound services in green ( )
- Westbound services in blue ( )
- Northbound Choa Chu Kang Branch Line services in khaki ( )
- Southbound Choa Chu Kang Branch Line services in brown ( )

Each station was also assigned a unique alphanumeric code, with the alphabet indicating which part of the island the station lies at (North, East, West, Central, Marina Bay region or Choa Chu Kang Branch Line) and the numbers (in ascending order from the centre of the island) indicating which part of that region the station is located at.

Code	Overview	Examples	Currently
A	Bukit Panjang LRT	A1 – A14	BP1 – BP14
B	Branch Line from Bukit Batok to Choa Chu Kang, superseded in 1996 by the North–South Line's extension through Woodlands to Choa Chu Kang	B1 – B3	NS2 – NS4
C	The two stations at the central business district (CBD), City Hall and Raffles Place	C1 – C2	EW13/NS25, EW14/NS26
E	Eastern stretch of East–West Line from Bugis to Pasir Ris, Expo	E1 – E13	EW1 – EW12, CG1
M	Marina Bay	M1	NS27
N	North–South Line from Dhoby Ghaut to Bukit Batok	N1 – N23	NS2 – NS24
W	Western stretch of East–West Line from Tanjong Pagar to Boon Lay excluding Dover	W1 – W12	EW15 – EW27

These were superseded in 2001 by two-digit codes as the latter might be exhausted with new MRT and LRT lines added to the network, thus only having 15 letters in total. However, "E", "N" and "W" were still found on viaduct pillars of the MRT and some traffic signals on the Westinghouse FS2000 signalling system (before upgrading to Thales SelTrac CBTC GoA 3 signalling system), but the "A" is still being used for the Changi Airport branch line. The codes for viaduct pillars are:

Viaduct Pillars
Code	Overview	Examples
A	Changi Airport Line from Tanah Merah to Expo tunnel portal	A0001 – A0052
B	Branch Line from Jurong East to Choa Chu Kang (1990–1996)	B001 – B226
E	East–West Line from Kallang tunnel portal to Pasir Ris	E001 – E602
N	North–South Line from Bishan to Jurong East	N001 – N346 (1990–1996); N001 – N1154 (1996–present)
W	East–West Line from Redhill tunnel portal to Tuas Link	W001 – W609 (1990–2009); W001 – W732 (2009–2017); W001 – W908 (2017–present)

Railway signals
Code	Summary	Examples
B	Bishan Depot	—N/a
C	Changi Depot	—N/a
E	East–West Line from Raffles Place to Pasir Ris	E1 – E73
N	North–South Line from Raffles Place to Admiralty	N3 – N116
NW	North–South Line from Jurong East to Admiralty including the Branch Line	NW1 – NW55
NW	Jurong East Modification Project	NW83 – NW85
S	North–South Line from Raffles Place to Marina South Pier	S7 – S30
SE	Changi Airport Line	SE02 – SE18
U	Ulu Pandan Depot	—N/a
W	East–West Line from Raffles Place to Joo Koon	W5 – W75
W	Jurong East Modification Project	W80 – W82

=== 1996 to 30 July 2001 ===
The colour and alphanumeric codes for each direction of travel remained unchanged, except that with the opening of the Woodlands Extension (connecting Yishun station to Choa Chu Kang station), the Jurong East – Choa Chu Kang Branch Line ceased to exist. As such, the formerly Northbound Choa Chu Kang Branch Line services in khaki travelled southbound to Marina Bay & as such were denoted as red while the formerly Southbound Choa Chu Kang Branch Line services in brown originated from Marina Bay, hence having travelled northbound it was denoted as yellow. The alphanumeric codes for these stations were also replaced. After Sembawang it is N14-N18, N20-N23, with the exception of N13 and N19, reserved for future stations Canberra and Sungei Kadut. B1-B3 were renumbered to N21-N23.

The Bukit Panjang LRT opened in 1999 and was given the colours purple and orange to represent its direction of travel. Due to the alignment of the route, which was a loop track around Bukit Panjang New Town, the map was different. The stations were given the alphanumeric code A1 to A14, with numbering starting from Choa Chu Kang interchange and going in an anti-clockwise direction on the loop. The directional arrow on the shared service track (between stations A1 to A6) was split, with half being purple and half being orange. From Bukit Panjang station, the orange arrows travelled in an anti-clockwise direction [(service B) via Petir] while the purple arrows travelled in a clockwise direction (service A) towards Senja. These were standardised into being grey since 2001 because of additional LRT lines such as Sengkang and Punggol LRT.

=== 31 July 2001 to 30 January 2020 ===
A diagram of the physical spread of the MRT network across the island, including lines that are under construction / under planning.

As there were plans to expand the network, the MRT System Map could no longer afford to have each direction of travel represented by a different colour. The map was revamped to have one colour as there would be more MRT lines in the future, which was announced by the Minister of Communications and Information Technology, Mr Yeo Cheow Tong. The pilot trials for new signages were done at Dover and at the North East Line.

Colours were used to represent each line rather than each direction of travel, cutting the usage of colours by half and preserving other colours for future lines.

- Red for North–South Line ( )
- Green for East–West Line ( )
- Purple for North East Line ( )
- Orange for Circle Line ( )
- Blue for Downtown Line ( )
- Brown for Thomson–East Coast Line ( )
- Teal for Jurong Region Line ( )
- Lime for Cross Island Line ( )
- Grey for all LRT lines ( )

The direction of travel was instead represented by numbers contained within a coloured circle located at the ends of each line, known as the destination number.

Destination Circle	Destination Code	Service	Destination
	EW1	East–West Line services	Pasir Ris
	EW2	East–West Line Short Trip Service	Tampines
	EW4	East–West Line Short Trip Service	Tanah Merah
	EW5	East–West Line Short Trip Service	Bedok
	EW6	East–West Line Short Trip Service	Kembangan
	EW7	East–West Line Short Trip Service	Eunos
	EW8	East–West Line Short Trip Service	Paya Lebar
	EW9	East–West Line Short Trip Service	Aljunied
	EW11	East–West Line Short Trip Service	Lavender
	EW12	East–West Line Short Trip Service	Bugis
	EW14	East–West Line Short Trip Service	Raffles Place
	EW16	East–West Line Short Trip Service	Outram Park
	EW19	East–West Line Short Trip Service	Queenstown
	EW21	East–West Line Short Trip Service	Buona Vista
	EW23	East–West Line Short Trip Service	Clementi
	EW24	East–West Line Short Trip Service	Jurong East
	EW26	East–West Line Short Trip Service	Lakeside
	EW27	East–West Line Short Trip Service	Boon Lay
	EW29	East–West Line Short Trip Service	Joo Koon
	EW30	East–West Line Short Trip Service	Gul Circle
	EW33	East–West Line services	Tuas Link
	CG	East–West Line shuttle services from Changi Airport	Tanah Merah
	CG1	Changi Airport Line Short working trips	Expo
	CG2	East–West Line shuttle services	Changi Airport
	NS1	North–South Line services	Jurong East
	NS2	North–South Line Short working trips	Bukit Batok
	NS3	North–South Line Short working trips	Bukit Gombak
	NS4	North–South Line Short working trips	Choa Chu Kang
	NS5	North–South Line Short working trips	Yew Tee
	NS7	North–South Line Short working trips	Kranji
	NS8	North–South Line Short working trips	Marsiling
	NS9	North–South Line Short working trips	Woodlands
	NS10	North–South Line Short working trips	Admiralty
	NS11	North–South Line Short working trips	Sembawang
	NS12	North–South Line Short working trips	Canberra
	NS13	North–South Line Short working trips	Yishun
	NS15	North–South Line Short working trips	Yio Chu Kang
	NS16	North–South Line Short working trips	Ang Mo Kio
	NS17	North–South Line Short working trips	Bishan
	NS19	North–South Line Short working trips	Toa Payoh
	NS21	North–South Line Short working trips	Newton
	NS22	North–South Line Short working trips	Orchard
	NS25	North–South Line Short working trips	City Hall
	NS26	North–South Line Short working trips	Raffles Place
	NS27	North–South Line Short working trips	Marina Bay
	NS28	North–South Line services	Marina South Pier
	NE1	North East Line services	HarbourFront
	NE3	North East Line Short working trips	Outram Park
	NE6	North East Line Short working trips	Dhoby Ghaut
	NE7	North East Line Short working trips	Little India
	NE8	North East Line Short working trips	Farrer Park
	NE10	North East Line Short working trips	Potong Pasir
	NE12	North East Line Short working trips	Serangoon
	NE14	North East Line Short working trips	Hougang
	NE15	North East Line Short working trips	Buangkok
	NE16	North East Line Short working trips	Sengkang
	NE17	North East Line Short working trips	Punggol
	NE18	North East Line services	Punggol Coast
		Circle Line Clockwise Loop	via Bayfront and Marina Bay
		Circle Line Anti-Clockwise Loop	via Marina Bay and Bayfront
CC1		Circle Line off-peak shuttle services / peak hour alternate services	Dhoby Ghaut
CC6		Circle Line off-peak hour services from Dhoby Ghaut	Stadium
CC7		Circle Line Short working trips	Mountbatten
CC9		Circle Line Short working trips	Paya Lebar
CC11		Circle Line Short working trips	Tai Seng
CC12		Circle Line Short working trips	Bartley
CC16		Circle Line Short working trips	Marymount
CC17		Circle Line Short working trips	Caldecott
CC23		Circle Line Short working trips	one-north
CC24		Circle Line Short working trips	Kent Ridge
CC26		Circle Line Short working trips	Pasir Panjang
CC27		Circle Line Short working trips	Labrador Park
CC29		Circle Line Short working trips	HarbourFront
CC32		Circle Line peak-hour alternate services from Dhoby Ghaut	Prince Edward Road
CC33		Circle Line Short working trips	Marina Bay
	DE2	Downtown Line services	Sungei Kadut (future)
	DT1	Downtown Line services (Until DTL2e opening) / short working trips (after DTL2e opening)	Bukit Panjang
	DT5	Downtown Line Short working trips	Beauty World
	DT8	Downtown Line Short working trips	Tan Kah Kee
	DT12	Downtown Line Short working trips	Little India
	DT13	Downtown Line Short working trips	Rochor
	DT14	Downtown Line Short working trips	Bugis
	DT19	Downtown Line Short working trips	Chinatown
	DT20	Downtown Line Short working trips	Fort Canning
	DT23	Downtown Line Short working trips	Bendemeer
	DT25	Downtown Line Short working trips	Mattar
	DT26	Downtown Line Short working trips	MacPherson
	DT27	Downtown Line Short working trips	Ubi
	DT29	Downtown Line Short working trips	Bedok North
	DT33	Downtown Line Short working trips	Tampines East
	DT34	Downtown Line Short working trips	Upper Changi
	DT35	Downtown Line services (Until 26 December 2026) / Short-Trip Service (From 26 December 2026)	Expo
	DT37	Downtown Line services	Sungei Bedok (from 26 December 2026)
	TE1	Thomson–East Coast Line services	Woodlands North
	TE2	Thomson–East Coast Line Short working trips	Woodlands
	TE3	Thomson–East Coast Line Short working trips	Woodlands South
	TE4	Thomson–East Coast Line Short working trips	Springleaf
	TE5	Thomson–East Coast Line Short working trips	Lentor
	TE9	Thomson–East Coast Line Short working trips	Caldecott
	TE11	Thomson–East Coast Line Short working trips	Stevens
	TE14	Thomson–East Coast Line Short working trips	Orchard
	TE17	Thomson–East Coast Line Short working trips	Outram Park
	TE22	Thomson–East Coast Line Short working trips	Gardens by the Bay
	TE23	Thomson–East Coast Line Short working trips	Tanjong Rhu
	TE26	Thomson–East Coast Line Short working trips	Marine Parade
	TE27	Thomson–East Coast Line Short working trips	Marine Terrace
	TE29	Thomson–East Coast Line services (Until end-2026) / Short-Trip Service (From end-2026)	Bayshore
	TE31	Thomson–East Coast Line services / Short-Trip-Service (future)	Sungei Bedok (from 26 December 2026)
	TE35	Thomson–East Coast Line services	Tanah Merah (mid-2030s)
	BP1	Bukit Panjang LRT	Choa Chu Kang
	STC	Sengkang LRT	Sengkang
	PTC	Punggol LRT	Punggol

Like before, each station was assigned a unique alphanumeric symbol. However, under this revamped system map, the letters in each symbol denotes the line instead and the number increases in ascending order from East to West (East–West Line), North to South (North–South Line), South West to North East (North East Line), in an anti-clockwise direction (Circle Line), in a clockwise direction from the North-west to the South-east (Downtown Line), and from the Thomson stretch in the North to the East Coast stretch in the East (Thomson–East Coast). Interchange stations will then have two or three codes.

Special codes were also used to denote the town centre. "STC" is Sengkang Town Centre and "PTC" is Punggol Town Centre.

Station Code	Service	Examples
NS	North–South Line	NS1-NS28
EW	East–West Line	EW1-EW33
CG	Changi Airport Line	CG, CG1-CG2
NE	North East Line	NE1-NE18
CC	Circle Line	CC1-CC34
CE	Circle Line Extension (currently disused)	CE1-CE2
DE	Downtown Line Extension (For Downtown Line 2 Extension Stations)	DE1-DE2
DT	Downtown Line	DT1-DT37
TE	Thomson–East Coast Line	TE1-TE31
JS	Jurong Region Line (South)	JS1-JS12
JE	Jurong Region Line (East)	JE1-JE7
JW	Jurong Region Line (West)	JW1-JW5
CR	Cross Island Line	CR1-CR23
CP	Cross Island Line (Punggol)	CP1-CP4
BP	Bukit Panjang LRT	BP1-BP13
SE	Sengkang LRT East Loop	SE1-SE5
SW	Sengkang LRT West Loop	SW1-SW8
PE	Punggol LRT East Loop	PE1-PE7
PW	Punggol LRT West Loop	PW1-PW7

For example:

- Bugis EW12 for the East–West Line section and DT14 for the Downtown Line section.
- Dhoby Ghaut NS24 for the North–South Line section, NE6 for the North East Line section and CC1 for the Circle Line section.
- Woodlands NS9 for the North–South Line section and TE2 for the Thomson–East Coast Line section.
- Bukit Panjang DT1 for the Downtown Line section and BP6 for the Bukit Panjang LRT Line section.
- Sengkang NE16 for the North East Line section and STC for the Sengkang LRT Line section.
- Punggol NE17 for the North East Line section and PTC for the Punggol LRT Line section.

However, the map was aesthetically unpleasing such as Circle Line not being a circular line and geographical inconsistencies. In 2019, Faiz Basha went viral for redesigning proposed MRT maps that have sleek concentric circles, rounded edges, and a clean, modern aesthetic.

=== 31 January 2020 to present ===
During a visit to the upcoming Thomson–East Coast Line stations in Woodlands, a redesigned MRT map was launched on 11 December 2019 by the Land Transport Authority to make it easier for commuters to plan their journeys. The new map features the Circle Line as a focal point on the map and being a circular line, as well as prominent landmarks and waterbodies added to the surrounding areas. In addition, QR codes are included with links to a fare calculator and maps in all four languages. The new map has since been made available to all MRT and LRT stations on 31 January 2020.

Destination circles are projected to be removed in the future, with the phase-out of numbers 8, 9 and 10 on the Circle Line in the MRT maps and platform displays towards the opening of Stage 6. The Jurong Region Line will also no longer use the destination circles.

== History of station and train announcements ==
=== SMRT Trains Ltd ===
Before 1994, train captains had to announce the station names manually. The public announcement system in all SMRT operated lines was introduced in 1990 when the Branch Line opened, beginning with the next stop announcement for interchange stations. After a successful trial, the announcement of station names when a train arrives at the station was only introduced between 1992 and 1994. The door closing announcement was later added in 1997 and the next stop announcement in 1998. Over time, however, some sections of the announcements were modified, and finally, the entire announcement system was changed in January 2008 in preparation for the installation of STARiS (the SMRT Active Route Map Information System) on all trains later that year. The new announcement system features a new voice, and a new chime before each announcement.

The original announcements were made by Juanita Melson. The announcement system was upgraded with the current announcer, Chan Hui Yuh, for example changing "doors closing" to "doors are closing" and "next stop" to "next station". Melson's announcements are now only used on the Bukit Panjang LRT together with the BPLRT trains.

All announcements on the NSEWL were changed again in October 2012 but was met by strong criticism by the public after Mandarin announcements were included, which were largely viewed as unnecessary. This was eventually removed on all trains by December 2012. However, Mandarin announcements are commonly used on lines operated by SBS Transit, oddly without controversy as compared to NSEWL.

=== SBS Transit Ltd ===
The North East Line and the Downtown Line, which are both operated by SBS Transit Ltd, features different announcements from SMRT operated lines. It features different chimes and a different announcer, as well as next station messages in Mandarin (and Malay and Tamil in some cases).

== History of the ticketing system ==
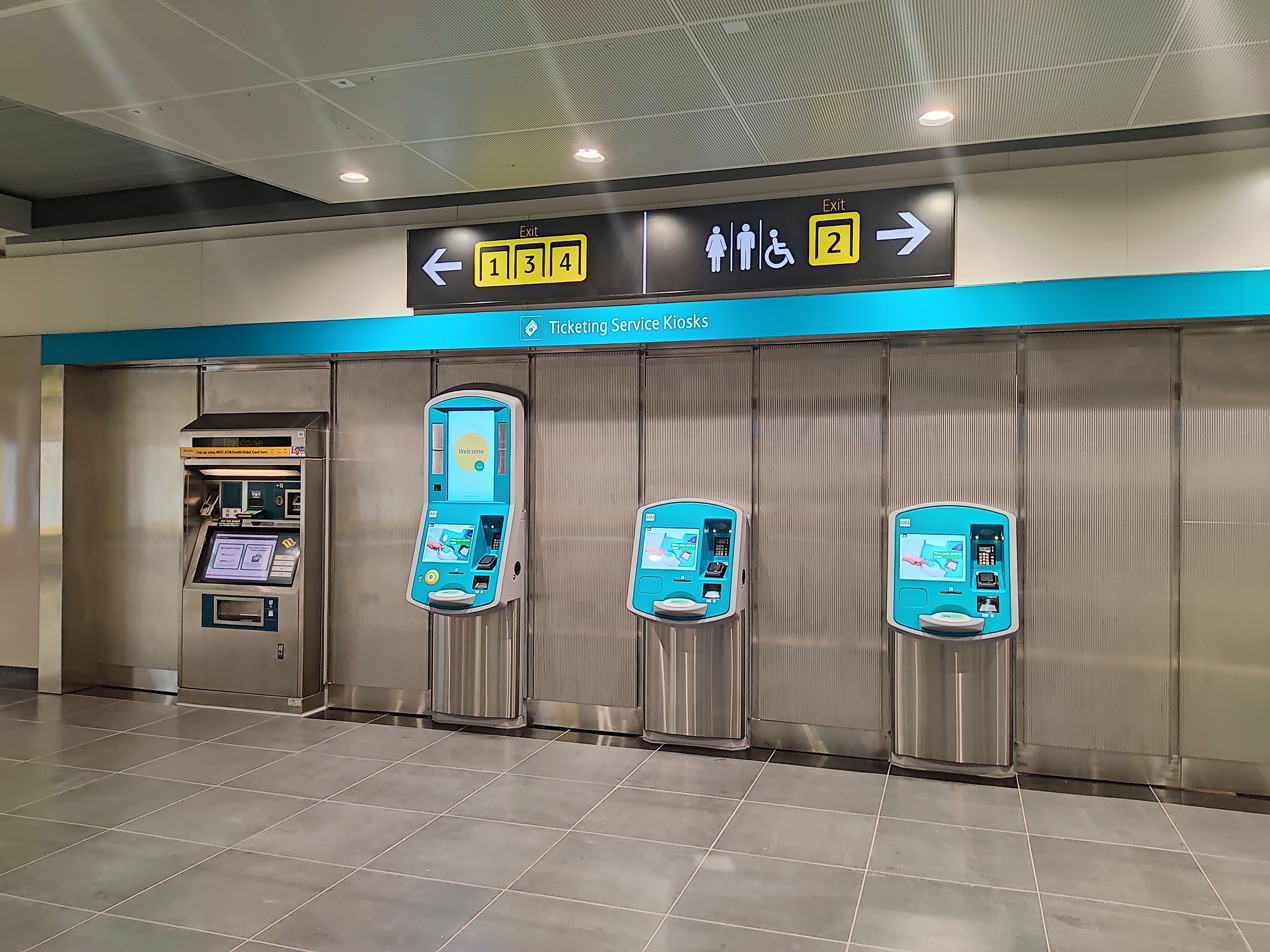
Various types of General Ticketing Machines (GTM) at Bright Hill MRT station, where passengers can purchase a Standard Ticket or add value to their EZ-Link card

=== 1987 to 2002 ===
When the MRT opened in 1987, fares ranged from S$0.50 to S$1.10 in S$0.10 increments for all adult tickets, regardless of whether they were single-trip or stored-value tickets. Several discounted fares were available: senior citizens and permanent residents above the age of 60 could travel on a flat fare of S$0.50 during off-peak hours; children below the height of 1.2 metres and full-time students in primary, secondary, pre-university and vocational training (VITB) institutions paid a flat fare of S$0.30 at all times.

Magnetic strip plastic tickets were used, in various forms. Stored-value tickets were called farecards and came in three types: the blue farecard was issued to adults, the magenta farecard to senior citizens, and the red farecard to children. Single-trip forms of these tickets were retained at the faregates on exiting the paid area of a destination station. Monthly discounted tickets were available in four values: beige, pink, and purple tickets for primary and tertiary students, and full-time national servicemen came with a value of S$13, S$30 and S$36, respectively; the peach ticket was for secondary, pre-university and VITB students, costing S$17 each. These discounted tickets were valid for a month from the date of purchase, allowed up to four trips a day, and were non-transferable.

These farecards cannot be used from 1 December 2002 and support has been terminated since June 2003 with the removal of metal holes and convert validators to printing tickets (by cash). It is currently no longer workable.

In the early years, single trip magnetic tickets were purchased at ticket vending machines with coins only. Notes could be broken up into small change at a separate change machine. Those holding magnetic multi-trip farecards could only reload their cards with additional credit at manual service counters or a separate add-value machine.

=== 2002 to 2009 ===
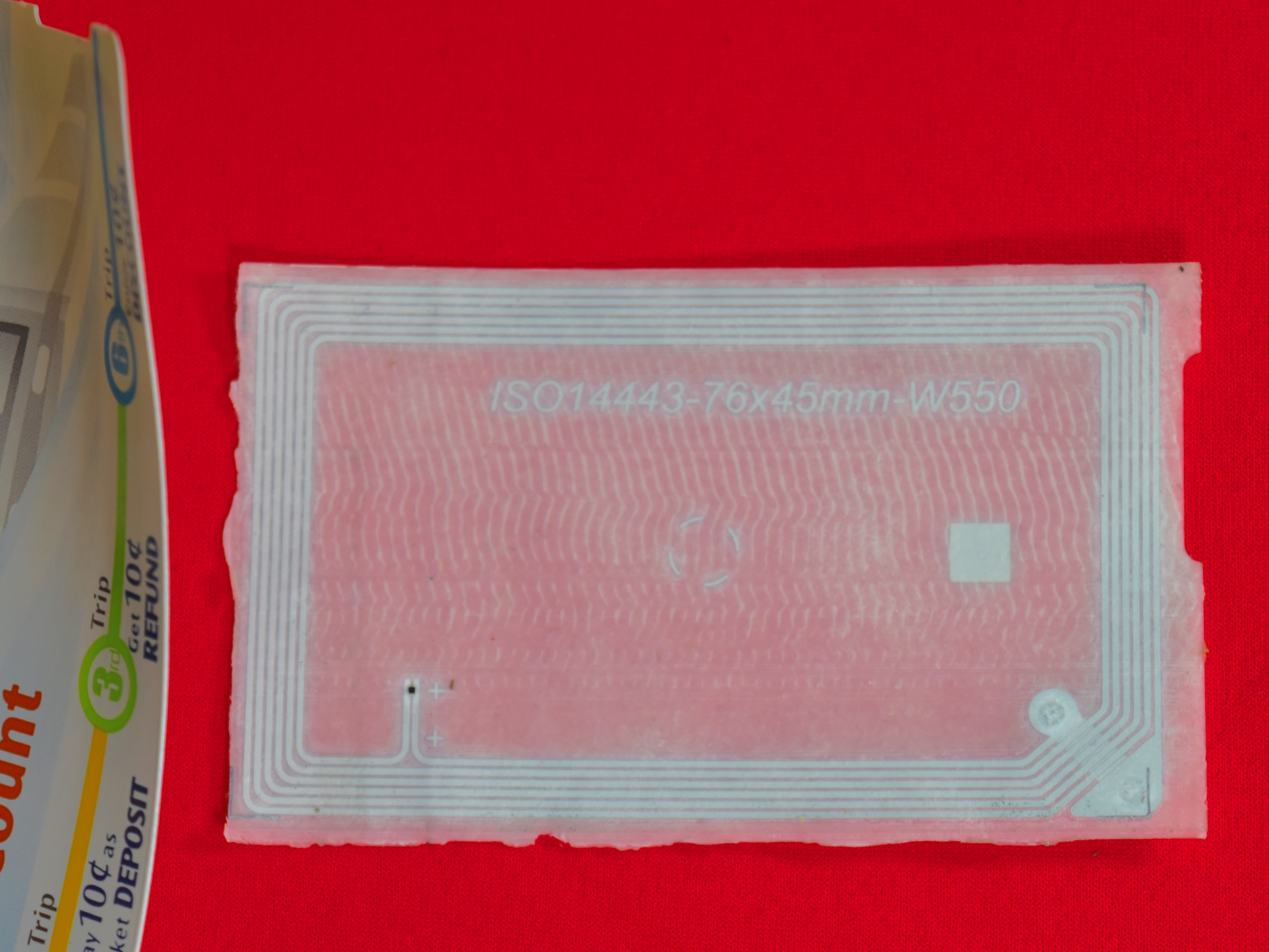
The plastic inlay (right) that contains IC and antenna inside the Standard Ticket paper contactless smart card (left)

The EZ-Link card is a contactless smart card, initially based on Sony's FeliCa smartcard technology. The cards are mainly used for the payment of transportation fares, but may also be used for payment at selected retail outlets. Established in 2002, the technology was promoted as the means for speedier and more convenient transactions and as well as being an efficient method of reducing fare evasion, although there have been some cases of overcharging users. As a benchmark, fares range from S$0.70 to S$3.20 for adults, S$0.70 to S$1.35 for senior citizens, and S$0.40 to S$0.50 for student EZ-Link cards. Patrons using an EZ-Link card receive a discount for their journey, including a discount if they use a connecting bus after their MRT ride.

The old EZ-Link card could be used up to September 2009, when the old EZ-Link card usage became limited support. It remains on some MRT stations.

Concession fares are available for children, students, senior citizens and national servicemen. Students are given free personalised cards, complete with their photos, names and national identification numbers. Regardless of its type, each card is assigned a unique card ID that can be used to recover the card if lost. Transport operators have organised lotteries that are based on these card IDs. The Singapore Tourist Pass offers unlimited travel for tourists on Singapore's public transport system. For S$8 a day, tourists can take any number of rides on buses and trains operated by SBS Transit, SMRT Buses and SMRT Trains.

=== Standard Ticket ===
A 1st generation standard ticket contactless smart card for single trips may also be purchased between S$2 and S$4 (inclusive of a S$1 refundable card deposit) for the payment of MRT and LRT fares. The card may be only purchased at the GTM. The deposit may also be retrieved by returning the card to the GTM within 30 days from the date of issue or donated to charity by depositing it in a collection box at any station. This card cannot be recharged with additional credit. The rationale behind such a refundable deposit feature was that the smartcard technology contained within each Standard Ticket makes each one costly enough to necessitate the recycling of Standard Tickets. Since November 2007, external readers were installed on GTMs at stations operated by SMRT Corporation to address problems of card jamming in insert slots. The slots, however, remain in use for the purpose of refunding Standard Ticket deposits.

A 2nd generation paper-based standard ticket contactless smart card for single and return trips may be purchased between S$1.10 and S$7 (inclusive of a S$0.10 refundable card deposit) for the payment of MRT and LRT fares. The card may only be purchased at the GTM. Unlike the first generation Standard Ticket, this second generation Standard Ticket can be recharged with additional credit for up to 6 trips within 30 days from the date of issue. The deposit will be refunded upon recharging the card for the third trip at the GTM. A further S$0.10 rebate will be given upon recharging the card for the sixth and final trip at the GTM. Credit purchased for the single/return trips must be used on the same day of purchase. For commuters who purchased credit for the return trip, but did not return to the original station on the 'return trip', they can top up the fare difference at the destination station if the purchased credit is less than value of the trip.

The General Ticketing Machines (GTM) were installed at all MRT stations since 2002 and replaced the ticket vending machine that has push buttons to select fare and accepts coins only, together with integrated ticketing machines and touch screen ticket vending machine. Fares for the single trip tickets are higher than those for EZ-Link cards. The single or return trip was available since 2013. Plans to discontinue the Standard Ticket started in August 2017. Sales of the standard tickets were phased out between January 2022 and March 2022. TransitLink Service Agents began to be deployed again from 27 December 2021 at various stations. The Thomson–East Coast Line and Downtown Line phased out sales of the standard tickets on 10 January 2022. The Circle Line, North East Line, Sengkang LRT and Punggol LRT phased out on 10 February 2022. The North–South Line, East–West Line and Bukit Panjang LRT phased it out last on 10 March 2022. As of 11 March 2022, standard tickets cannot be bought and commuters have to use other methods to pay for their fare.

=== 2009 to present ===
Main articles: CEPAS

On 26 August 2008, Land Transport Authority announced a two-month trial of the new generation Contactless ePurse Application (CEPAS) card that was developed in-house. It is intended to standardise the technology of cashless payment, allowing for use on public transport, Electronic Road Pricing (ERP), everyday shopping and meals. The card has replaced this generation of EZ-Link cards in 2009 and aims to encourage competition by allowing up to four CEPAS card issuers. Mass replacement of the old Sony FeliCa cards to the new CEPAS cards went on at TransitLink Ticket offices and Singapore Post outlets till 7 October 2009.
