= Masjid Wak Tanjong =

Mosque in Paya Lebar, Singapore

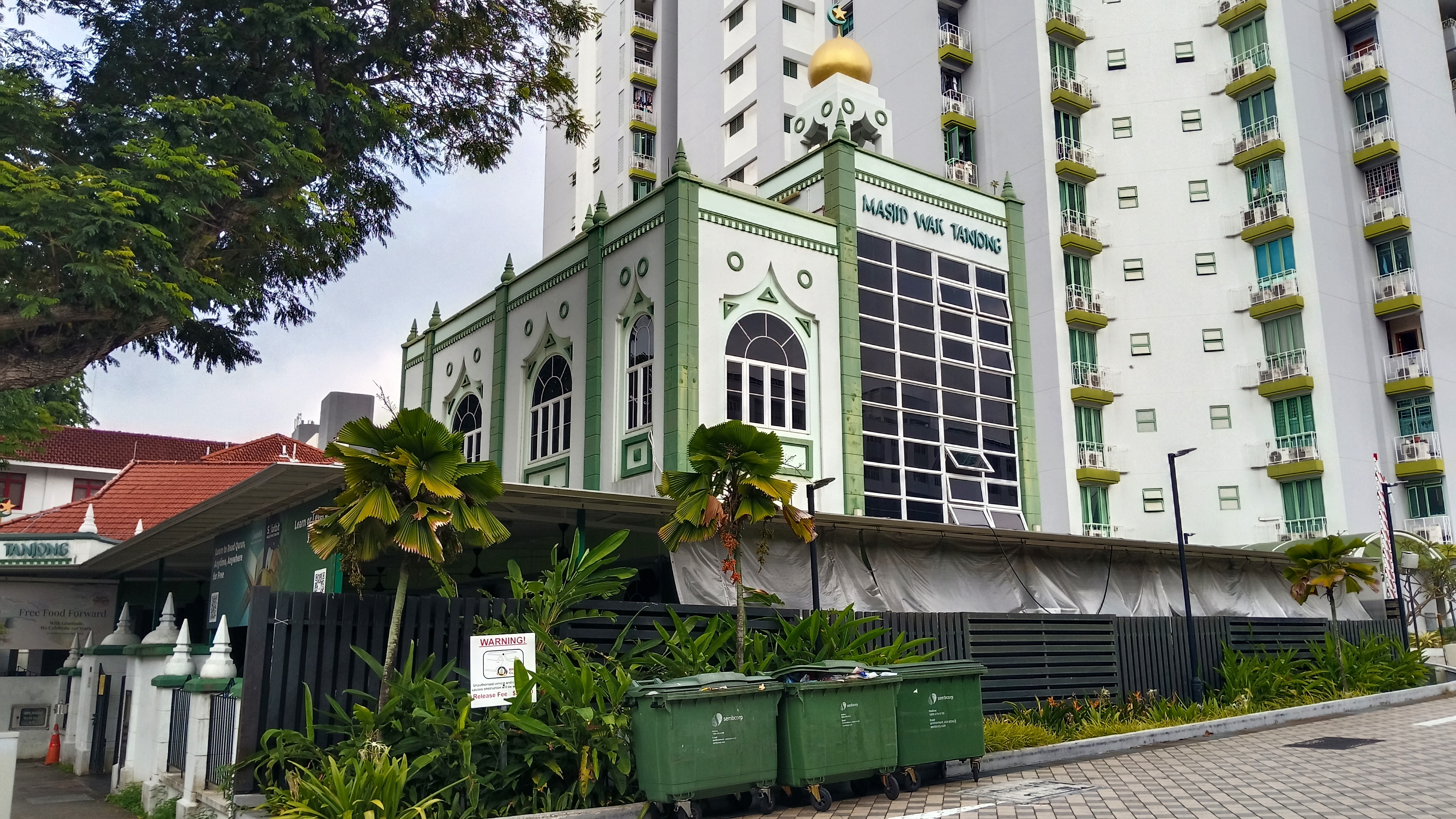

- Location in Singapore

Religion
- Affiliation: Sunni Islam

Location
- Location: 25 Paya Lebar Rd, Singapore 409004
- Country: Singapore
- Coordinates: 1.3176538°N 103.8919467°E

Architecture
- Type: Mosque
- Style: Eclectic
- Established: 17 March 1873
- Completed: 1873 (original structure); 1998 (current building)

Masjid Wak Tanjong is a mosque located along Paya Lebar Road in the eastern part of Geylang, Singapore. Built in 1873, it is named after its founder Wak Tanjong. It has been rebuilt three times in 1913, 1932 and finally in 1998. The mosque is situated next to the Paya Lebar MRT station and is accessible from there.

== History ==
Originally, a simple wooden surau was built on 17 March 1873 on land which was a waqf endowment by Wak Tanjong, a philanthropist from Malacca. The surau was later demolished and a mosque made from bricks and concrete was built in its place in 1913. The mosque was rebuilt again as a larger structure in 1932 by Mohammed Ally Tanjong, an Indian Muslim merchant and the son of the original founder. A private cemetery was also established behind the mosque which served as the burial place of Wak Tanjong, his wife, and close relatives. Burials in this cemetery ceased by 1973, along with all Muslim cemeteries nationwide with the exclusion of those within the Choa Chu Kang Cemetery.

In 1993, it was announced that the mosque would be completely rebuilt to accommodate more worshippers. More plans for the mosque were revealed in 1995, as well as a sketch of what the proposed mosque would be like. A finalized scale model of the mosque was also unveiled in 1996. The mosque was then closed in April 1996 as the reconstruction works had started. It was completed in 1998 with the official reopening ceremony in August of that year.

In 2002, the private cemetery at the back of the mosque was exhumed and reinterred at the Pusara Abadi cemetery. In 2014, the mosque was considered eligible to be preserved by the Urban Redevelopment Authority (URA). Like all the other mosques nationwide, it was affected by the COVID-19 pandemic in 2020 and was closed down. After the pandemic, it reopened and resumed its usual services. The mosque celebrated its 150th anniversary in 2024, launching several welfare programs to celebrate the event such as distributions of food to needy families.

== Architecture ==
Masjid Wak Tanjong is built in a fusion of Malay and Indo-Saracenic architecture, with modern design elements added into the mix. The domed pavilion at the second entrance for female worshippers is preserved from the original 1930s structure and was untouched during the 1998 reconstruction. A metal plaque commemorating the history of the mosque was installed at the entrance in 2024.

== Transportation ==
Masjid Wak Tanjong is located directly next to the Paya Lebar MRT station on the East–West line. The nearest bus stop to the mosque is at Paya Lebar Station Exit D which connects the mosque to the Bedok, Punggol, Sengkang, Serangoon and Marine Parade neighborhoods. Next to the mosque is the old Paya Lebar Office Centre, formerly a fire station which also contained a musalla before its closure.

== See also ==
- List of mosques in Singapore
