= Tanjong Katong Complex =

Shopping complex in Singapore

Coordinates: 1.3160°N 103.8921°E

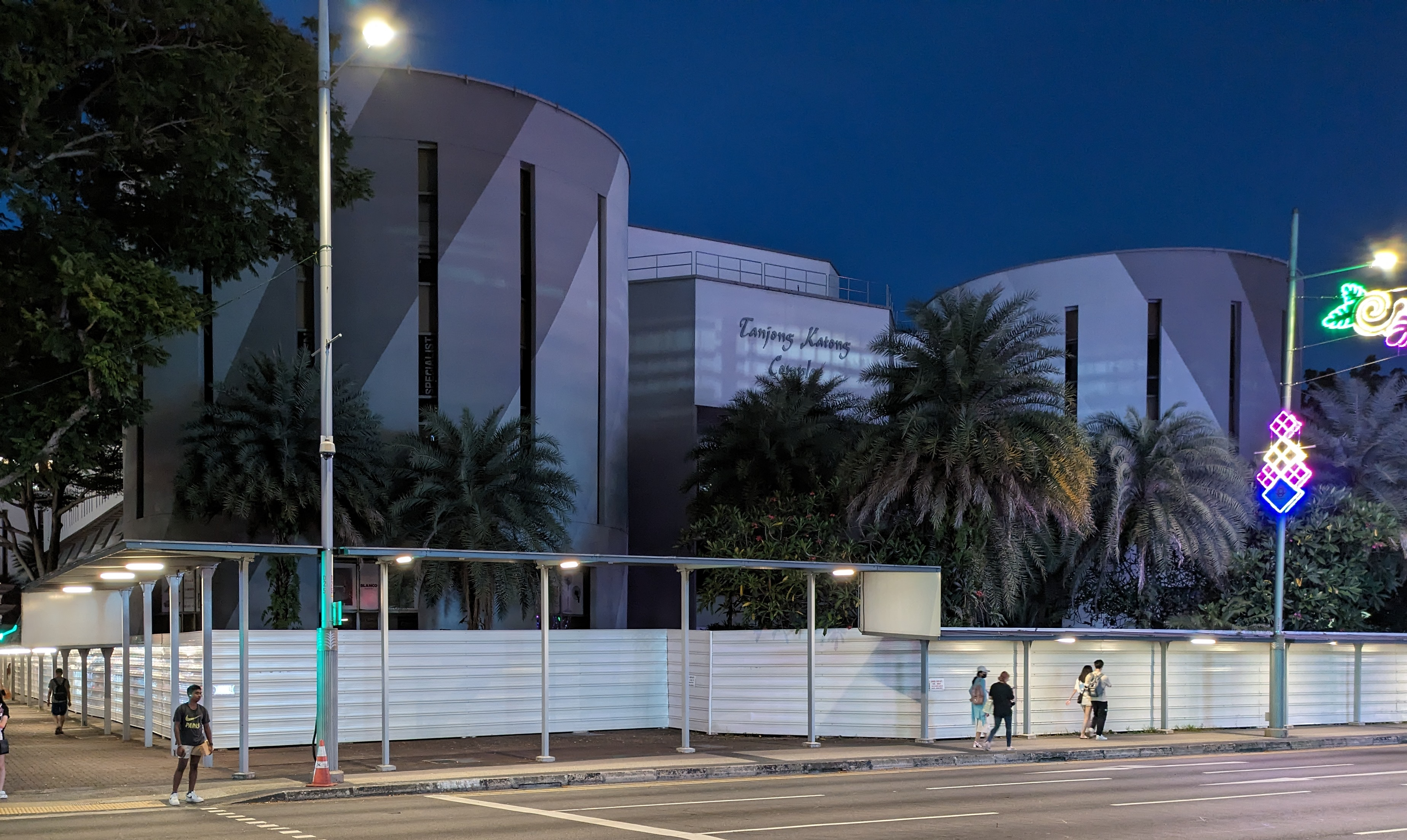
Tanjong Katong Complex in 2024 during renovations

Tanjong Katong Complex is a shopping complex in Geylang Serai, Singapore. Completed in 1982, the complex was the first air-conditioned shopping complex built by the Housing and Development Board and has since become known for servicing the Malay community in the area.

== History ==
Plans to build the complex was announced in 1980 by the Housing and Development Board. The complex opened in 1983 and initially housed a supermarket named Yokoso, which was the anchor tenant. The complex became known for servicing the Malay community in the area, particularly around Hari Raya, following the closure of the Geylang Serai Market.

The Singapore Land Authority announced on 8 December 2021 that the complex would undergo major renovations from August 2023 to June 2026. The renovations are a part of multiple redevelopments in the Geylang Serai done in an effort to make Geylang Serai a "culturally distinct precinct". Several of the more iconic features of the complex, such as the slanted columns of the building facing Tanjong Katong Road, will be preserved. Plans for the renovations include a new thoroughfare connecting to a new entrance at Sims Avenue and a rooftop F&B space.
