= Jalan Kubor Cemetery =

Historic cemetery in Kampong Glam, Singapore

Jalan Kubor Cemetery Tanah Perkuburan Jalan Kubor Ruělán Gǔbǎi Gōngmù (惹兰古柏公墓)

- Location in Singapore

Religion
- Affiliation: Sunni Islam

Location
- Location: Jalan Kubor, Singapore 199205
- Country: Singapore
- Coordinates: 1.3046971°N 103.8589049°E

Architecture
- Type: Cemetery
- Style: See below
- Founder: Syed Omar Aljunied (Commoner's cemetery); Ali Iskandar of Johor (Tittacheri Muslim Cemetery)
- Completed: 19th century

The Jalan Kubor Cemetery is a disused Islamic cemetery located in the Kampong Glam district of Rochor, Singapore. It has its origins in the 19th century and contains at least 4,752 graves belonging to Muslims from all walks of life, including royalty and nobility.

== History ==
The Jalan Kubor Cemetery is a complex consisting of three burial grounds, which are two cemeteries for royalty and commoners, as well as an Indian Muslim graveyard. Since 1973, all burials have ceased in the cemetery under the orders of the National Environment Agency (NEA). The cemetery has been earmarked for residential development in 1998. Active buildings at the edges of the cemetery grounds are the Madrasah Aljunied Al-Islamiah and Masjid Malabar.

=== Old Malay Cemetery ===
Graves of Malay royalty in the Old Malay Cemetery.

The Old Malay Cemetery was founded before 1829 as the resting place of relatives of the dynasty ruling the Sultanate of Johor. It was also known as the Sultan's Keramat. The burial ground was known to British authorities as being the resting place of "Malayan princes." The core of it, known as the Royal Mound, took the form of an elevated burial plot, with stairs leading up to the spaces where the graves stood. Although the Old Malay Cemetery was originally intended exclusively for royal internments, Sultan Ali Iskandar Shah would later permit commoners to bury their dead there in 1848. It became a popular area for rich Malay merchants and nobility to bury their deceased.

Ngah Ibrahim, a participant in the assassination of James W. W. Birch, was buried in this part of the Jalan Kubor Cemetery during his exile in colonial Singapore until his remains were exhumed in September 2006 and flown to Perak, his home country.

=== Commoners' cemetery ===
This part of the Jalan Kubor Cemetery was founded by Syed Omar Aljunied during his lifetime, between 1820 to 1852. It is situated within close proximity to the Madrasah Aljunied. The cemetery was established as an awqaf, an Islamic charitable endowment that could not be repossessed by the founder. A domed mausoleum was built for Syed Omar in the cemetery as well after his death, and was later accompanied by the burial of his grandson Syed Alwee Aljunied, as well as several other relatives. The mausoleum then served as the main resting place for most the Aljunied family until 2002, when their remains were exhumed and reinterred at a burial plot outside Masjid Omar Kampong Melaka, a mosque founded by Syed Omar.

=== Tittacheri Muslim Cemetery ===
The grave of an Indian Muslim personage in the Tittacheri Muslim Cemetery.

The Tittacheri Muslim Cemetery was an Indian Muslim burial ground. It was founded on 26 August 1848 by the reigning Sultan, Ali Iskandar of Johor. Known to British authorities as a graveyard for the Klings, it was located directly next to the Old Malay Cemetery. It was also used by elites from the Bugis and Banjar people, such as Ambo Sooloh. A single mosque, Masjid Malabar, was erected in 1963 on the site of an older mosque to serve the cemetery. Unlike the graveyard, which had been inactive since 1973, Masjid Malabar was still in use and regularly hosted the Friday prayers. Graves in the vicinity of Masjid Malabar were also incorporated into the annexe of the mosque during a 2023 expansion project.

== Significance ==
The Jalan Kubor Cemetery serves as a memorial to the multicultural life in Kampong Glam, due to its tombstones which are inscribed with various languages that include Malay, Gujarati, Arabic, English, Chinese and both Javanese and Bugis Aksara, while the tombstones themselves display foreign architectural influence such as Ottoman architecture. The place also holds religious significance, as some the graves in the cemetery are revered as keramats by locals. The mausoleums of Kunhi Koya Thangal and Ambo Sooloh, as well as the tombs of Malabari saints in the Indian Muslim part of the cemetery are prominently visited sites that were conserved during the expansion works to Masjid Malabar.

== Notable burials ==
There are more than four thousand burials in the Jalan Kubor Cemetery, with a total of 4,752 that were recorded by the National Heritage Board.

=== Royalty ===
- Tengku Aisyah (d. 1917), a member of the House of Bendahara and the daughter of Tengku Alam Shah, instigator of the 1879 civil war in Jementah.
- Tengku Abdul Kadir (d. 1957), a president of the Malay Union in the 1940s.

=== Commoners ===
- Haji Osman Ambok Dalek Daeng Pasandrek bin Haji Ali (d. 1916), a Bugis merchant who funded a construction project to reinforce the Rochor River.
- Kunhi Koya Thangal (d. 1950), and Islamic scholar and leader of the Malabar Muslims in Singapore. His mausoleum can be found in the Tittacheri Muslim Cemetery which has been incorporated into Masjid Malabar.
- Ambo Sooloh (d. 1963), Singaporean merchant of Bugis descent and co-founder of the Utusan Melayu newspaper. His tomb can be found behind Masjid Malabar, along with those of his parents.

== See also ==
- Muslim cemeteries in Singapore
