= Syed Omar Aljunied =

Arab Singaporean merchant & philanthropist

Syed Omar al-Junaid
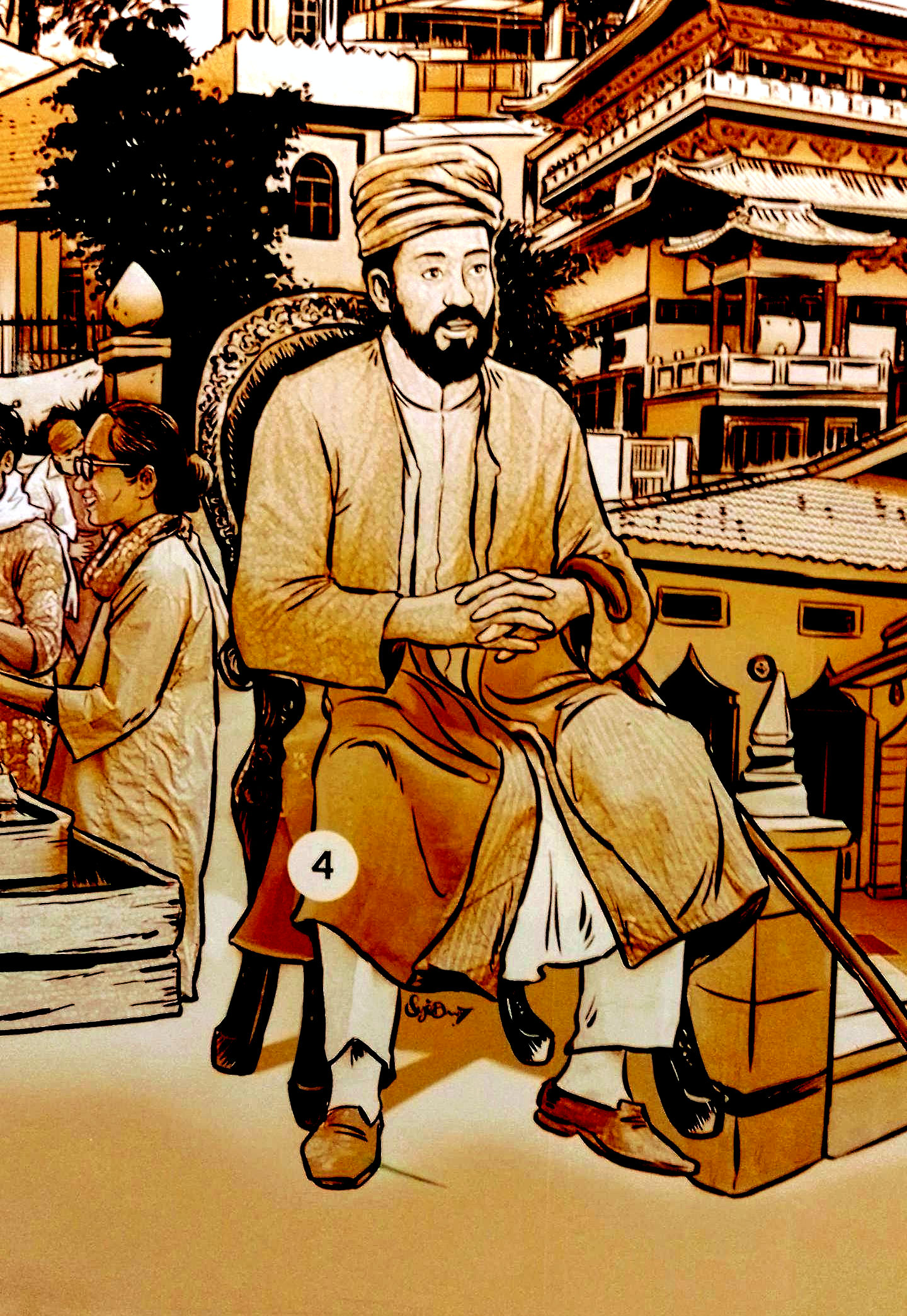
- An illustration of Syed Omar al-Junaid seen at Paya Lebar MRT station.
- Born: 1792; Hadhramaut, Yemen Eyalet
- Died: 6 November 1852 (aged 59–60); Singapore
- Burial: Masjid Omar Kampong Melaka (formerly Jalan Kubor Cemetery)
- House: al-Junaid
- Religion: Sunni Islam
- Occupation: Merchant; Philanthropist

Syed Omar Aljunied (1792–1852), full name Syed Omar bin Ali Aljunied (Arabic: السيد عمر بن علي الجنيد; transliterated as Sayyid ʿUmar bin ʿAlī al-Junayd) was an Arab Singaporean merchant and philanthropist from Hadhramaut. He built the Masjid Omar Kampong Melaka, the oldest mosque in Singapore. Syed Omar Aljunied is regarded as an important figure in the history of Singapore.

== Biography ==
Syed Omar bin Ali Aljunied was born in 1792 in the al-Junaid family which hailed from Hadhramaut. The al-Junaid family is a branch of the Ba 'Alawi sada. Syed Omar set up a business in Palembang, which was under the control of the Dutch East Indies at the time. He also traded in Penang. He then migrated to Singapore in the 1820s along with his family to set up another business in Singapore. The reasons for his migration are either because of Singapore being a free port (hence making it attractive and profitable) or because he was invited by Sir Stamford Raffles to set up his business there and improve Singapore's economy.

=== Life in Singapore ===
During his residence in Singapore, Syed Omar became one of the most prominent Arab merchants in Singapore. In 1823, a rival trader from Pahang named Yassin attempted an assassination on Syed Omar, which he escaped from unscathed, but the attack resulted in the British Resident William Farquhar being stabbed by Yassin instead. Yassin was then incarcerated and executed afterwards, and received a small cult following in the form of his grave being turned into a holy site, or keramat shrine until it was demolished by local authorities.

In 1851, Syed Omar was appointed by the British authorities to work alongside fellow merchant Tan Kim Seng to represent the Straits Settlements for a business exhibition held in London. As a philanthropist, Syed Omar donated land and properties to construct buildings to benefit the local community, for example donating a large portion of his land for Tan Tock Seng to establish a hospital, which still stands to this day.

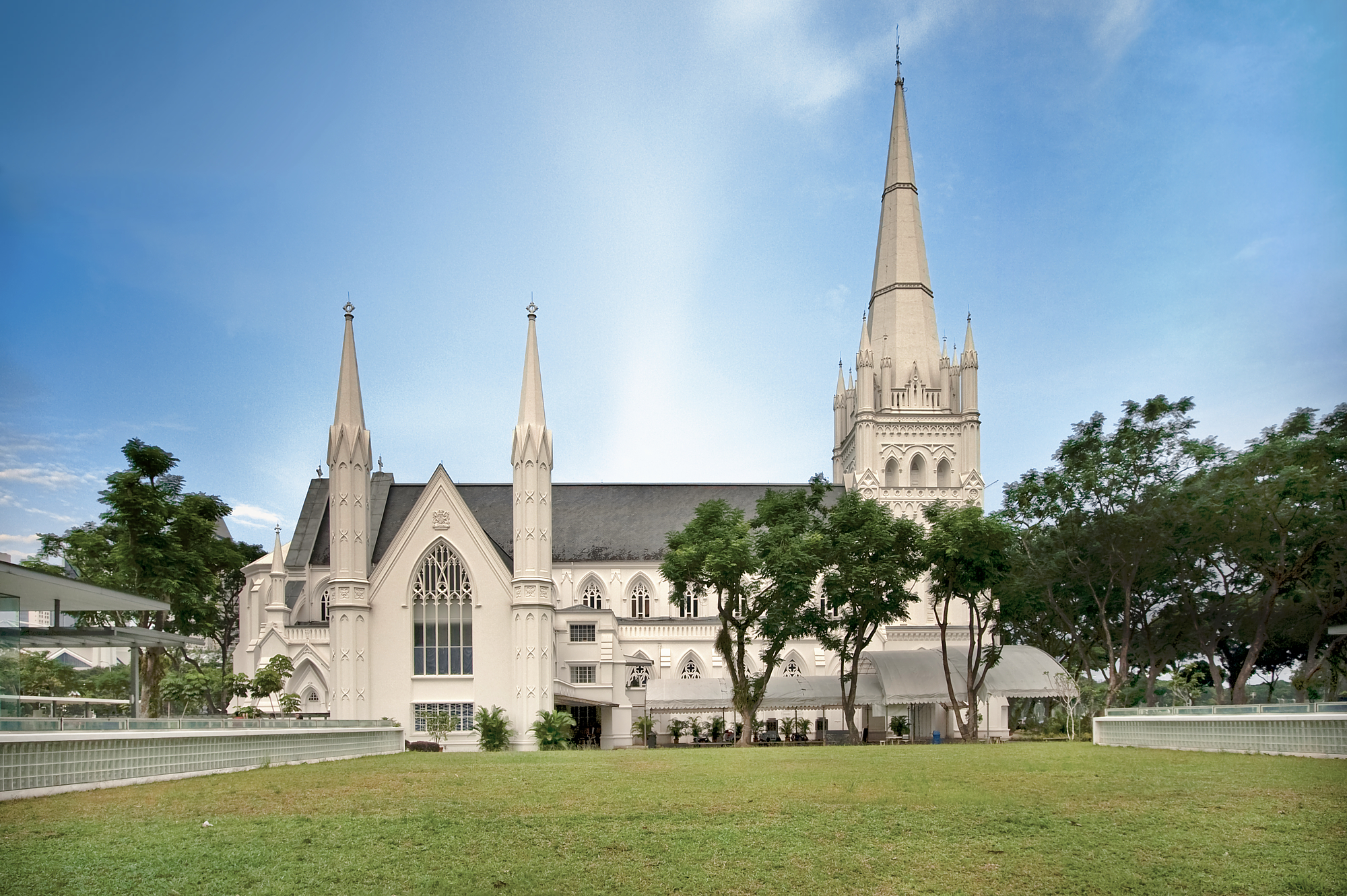
Aside from Muslim places of worship, Syed Omar also donated land for colonial officers to build the St. Andrew's Cathedral.

Being a Muslim, Syed Omar Aljunied provided waqf (inalienable charitable foundations) through donations to benefit the Muslims of Singapore, such as the Masjid Omar Kampong Melaka and a plot of land within the historic Jalan Kubor Cemetery. He also funded a complete reconstruction of the Indian-origin Masjid Bencoolen in 1845. Aside from Muslim religious sites, Syed Omar also donated land to be used for the construction of St. Andrew's Cathedral which was completed in 1836.

=== Death ===
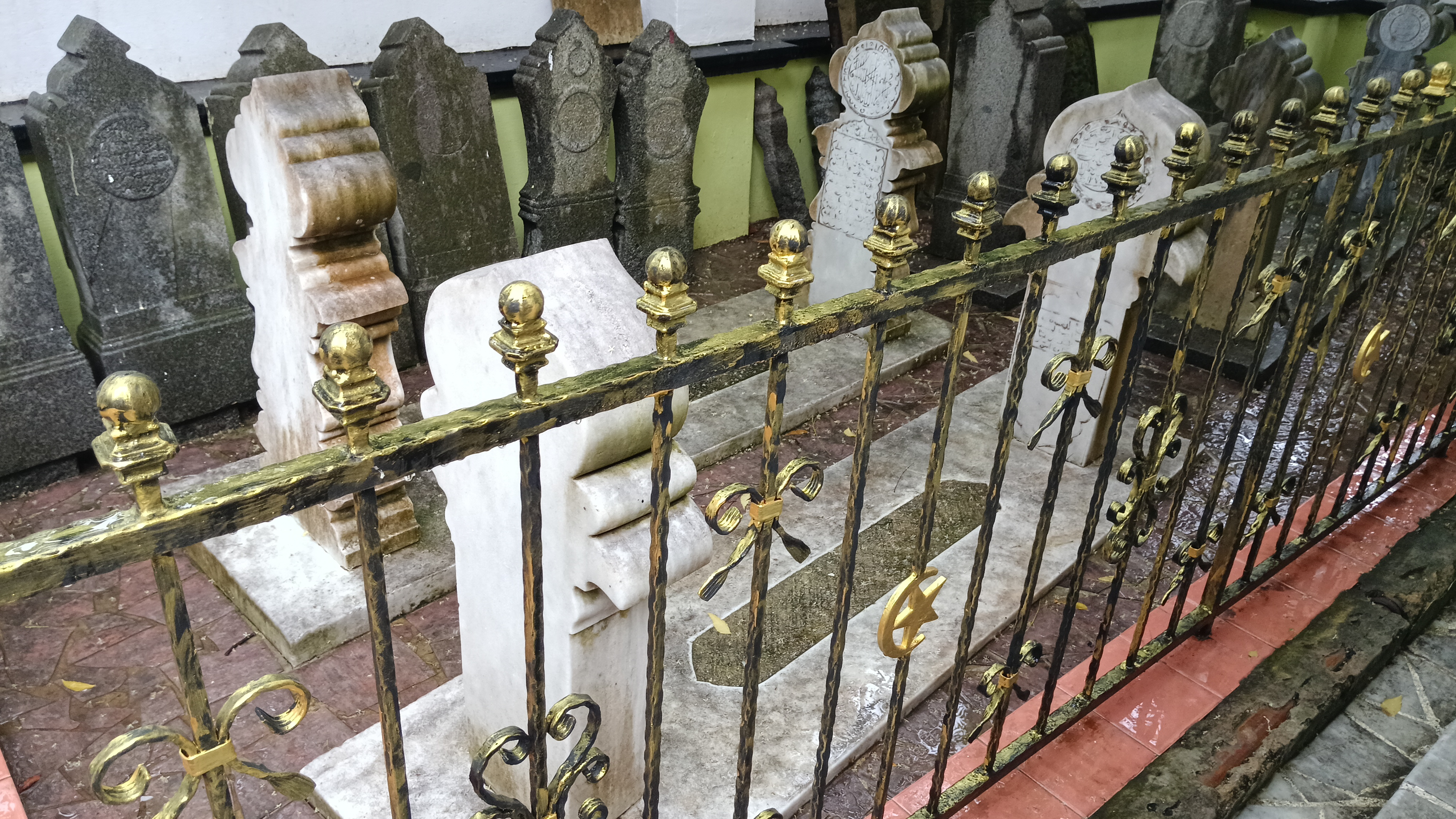
Tomb of Syed Omar Aljunied within the courtyard of Masjid Omar Kampong Melaka

Syed Omar died on 6 November 1852. He was buried in Jalan Kubor Cemetery. In the early 2000s, the graves of Syed Omar and the rest of his family at Jalan Kubor were exhumed and interred within the courtyard grounds of the Masjid Omar Kampong Melaka.

== Legacy ==
Syed Omar Aljunied was remembered as a prominent figure in Singapore's early history during colonial rule. Omar Road was named after him that led to his mosque at what is now the Clarke Quay area; this street was demolished during modern redevelopment. Aljunied Road was also named after him.

The name of Syed Omar is also present on textile products produced in the Toko Aljunied store located along Arab Street. An annual congregational prayer for Syed Omar, known as Haul Akbar, is celebrated in the oldest mosque in Singapore which he established.

An illustration of him was displayed at Paya Lebar MRT station as part of The Paya Lebar Story public art display.

== See also ==
- Aljunied
- Arab Singaporeans
