= Ambo Sooloh =

Singaporean businessman and philanthropist (1891–1963)

Haji Ambo Sooloh
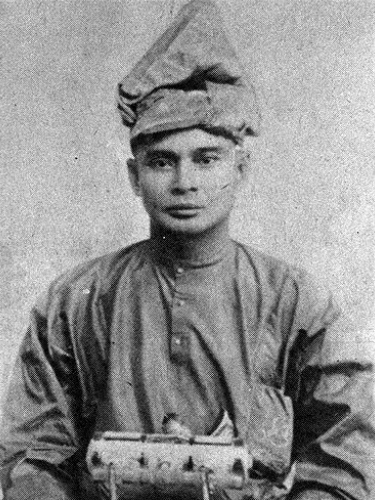
- Sooloh, c. 1934
- Born: Sooloh bin Omar Ali; 1891; Singapore
- Died: 1963 (aged 72); Singapore
- Resting place: Jalan Kubor Cemetery
- Occupation: Businessman
- Spouse: 2
- Children: 10

Ambo Sooloh (Note: Also spelt as Ambok Sooloh or Embok Suloh.) (1891 – 1963) was a Singaporean businessman and philanthropist. Born in Singapore to a wealthy mercantile family, Sooloh was one of the founders of the Malay-language newspaper Utusan Melayu. He also served as the chairman of the Singapore Malay Union (Kesatuan Melayu Singapura) from 1934 to 1937.

== Early life ==
Sooloh's father, Omar Ali, owned black pepper and gambier plantations in Borneo and Sumatra. In 1880, he emigrated from his hometown of Pontianak to Singapore and soon became the de facto leader of Bugis-Malay businessmen in the region. Sooloh, his youngest son, was born in Singapore in 1891. Omar Ali died in 1921, leaving Sooloh to take charge of the property and trading empire that he had established in Singapore.

== Career ==
In 1927, Sooloh was appointed as a Justice of the Peace. In 1934, on behalf of the entire Malay community in Singapore, he presented the governor of the Straits Settlements, Sir Shenton Thomas, with a letter affirming "their loyalty to the country and the British Government." The same year, Sooloh was chosen to succeed the recently deceased Mohamed Eunos bin Abdullah as both chairman of the Singapore Malay Union (Kesatuan Melayu Singapiura) and Malay representative in the Legislative Council. Under Sooloh's leadership from 1934 to 1937, the Malay Union worked closely with the government and only offered "mild criticism" of their Malay-related policies. Sooloh was succeeded by Daud bin Mohamed Shah.

In January 1938, twenty Malay Union members—including future President of Singapore Yusof Ishak—began discussing the idea of a Malay-language newspaper fully owned and managed by native Malayan Malays, as opposed to Muslims of Arab or Indian descent. Such an endeavour had only been attempted once (by another Malay Union member) and it was met with little success due to a lack of funds. To ensure that their proposed newspaper would not suffer a similar fate, Yusof Ishak and others were tasked with selling shares to raise enough capital for the newly registered Utusan Melayu Press Limited. Although they failed to cover much ground, Sooloh and Malay Union chairman Daud were able to raise S$8,500 to keep the union's newspaper dreams alive.

The newspaper's board of directors consisted of Daud as its president and Sooloh, Abdul Hamid bin Mohamed, Ismail bin Mohamed Taib, Abdul Ghani bin Omar, Abdul Jalil bin Harun, and Yusof Ishak as its members. On 29 May 1939, Utusan Melayu's first issue was published.

In December 1943, Sooloh became one of the first members of the Malay Welfare Association (MWA). He was also a trustee of Sultan Mosque, as well as a patron of both the Darul Taklam football club and the Malay Soccer Association (Persatuan Bolasepak Melayu).

== Later years and legacy ==
Sooloh died in 1963, aged 72. He was buried near his father at Singapore's oldest Muslim cemetery in Jalan Kubor (behind Masjid Malabar). Two years after Sooloh's death, the three-storey house that Sooloh, his two wives, six daughters, and four sons had lived in was torn down. A lane in a former Malay settlement (present-day Kaki Bukit) was once named after Sooloh.
