= Al-Junaid family =

Family of Arab Singaporeans of Yemeni origin

Al-Junaid الجنيد
- Hadhramite Arabs
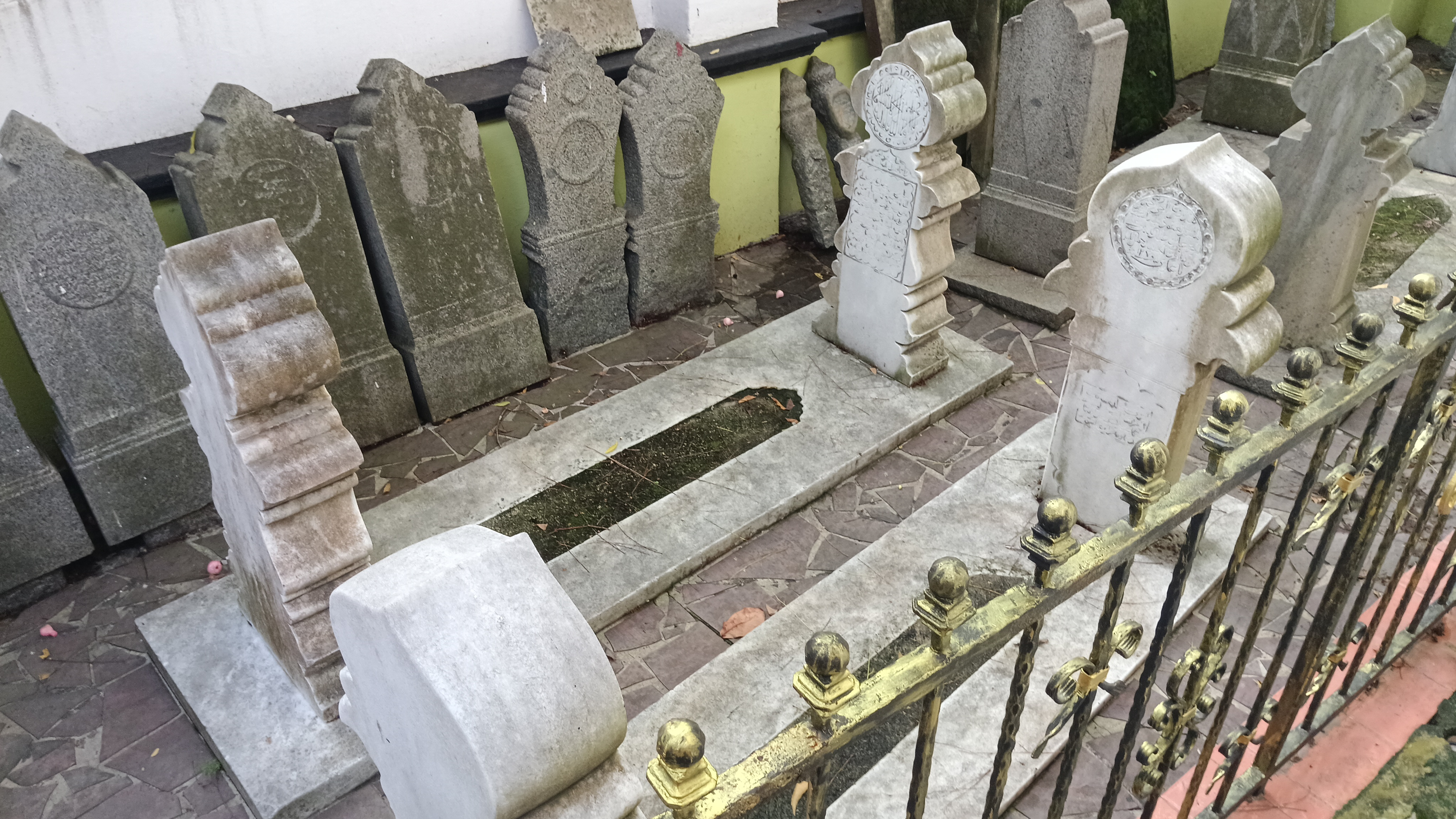
- The private burial ground of the Aljunieds, situated in the rear courtyard of Masjid Omar Kampong Melaka.
- Location: Hadhramaut (country of origin); Singapore (major diaspora)
- Religion: Sunni Islam

The House of Al-Junayd (Arabic: الجنيد, more commonly spelled Aljunied) are an Arab family and tribe from Hadhramaut, Yemen. They are known for their presence in Southeast Asia and are also remembered in Singapore as being the first Arabs to arrive on the island.

== History ==
The Aljunieds were from the Ba'alawi, a group of Hadhramite families that held the Sayyid status and claimed a common ancestor in Ahmad al-Muhajir. In the 18th century, some of the Aljunieds left Yemen for the Muslim-majority parts of Southeast Asia, where they established businesses centred in Palembang and Penang. After the island of Temasek, now named Singapore, had been handed over to the British in 1819, the Aljunieds emigrated there between 1820 to 1821, attracted by Singapore's new status as a free port. They were the first Arabs to set foot in Singapore and were given a warm welcome by Sir Stamford Raffles, the contemporary lieutenant-governor of British Bencoolen and the de facto founder of modern Singapore. Both Stamford Raffles and William Farquhar, the first British Resident of the country, held good relations with the Aljunieds.

Syed Omar bin Ali Aljunied, the patriarch of the family in Singapore, established a burial ground along Jalan Kubor Road, where the private burial ground of the Aljunieds were situated in a domed mausoleum. The Aljunied family mausoleum stood in the cemetery until 2002 when it was relocated to a site off Havelock Road in front of the mosque there.

Aside from Singapore, the Aljunieds also held a prominent presence in Penang as a family of Arab traders. Their main residence was in Jelutong, a district of George Town. They also had a burial ground within the cemetery of Masjid Jamek Jelutong.

== Prominent members ==
=== Syed Omar Aljunied ===
Syed Omar bin Ali Aljunied (1792–1852) is regarded as one of the most prominent members of the Aljunied family, due to his philanthropist and contributions to the infrastructure of early Singapore, which include the construction of mosques and his donation of land to build medical institutions.

Syed Omar built a mosque off Havelock Road in 1820, which was the first recorded awqāf in Singapore. This mosque, later known as Masjid Omar Kampong Melaka, was rebuilt in 1855 and underwent modernization in the 1980s. It was also gazetted as a national monument of the country on 11 November 2001, holding the 59th position in the registry of said monuments.

In 1845, Syed Omar reconstructed Masjid Bengkali, converting it into a proper mosque instead of a wooden attap structure. He also built several smaller mosques in the Rochor and Kallang districts for the Malay communities, all of which did not survive to the present day due to being demolished for redevelopment efforts.

Aside from mosques, Syed Omar also contributed land for the construction of Saint Andrew's Cathedral near the City Hall. As a philanthropist, he also donated land for the construction of the Tan Tock Seng Hospital in Novena.

=== Sharifah Rogayah ===
Sharifah Rogayah was a great-granddaughter of the famed Muslim mystic Habib Noh, related to the Aljunied family by marriage. Originally living in Singapore, she later followed her husband to Penang and resided in Jelutong, where she is buried next to him in the cemetery behind the city's oldest congregational mosque. A cenotaph in her memory was built in 1999, located in the Duxton Plain Park in Outram. This cenotaph is currently revered as a keramat and is believed by locals to be her burial place, despite her living descendants denying that she is buried there.

=== Syed Ahmad Aljunied ===
Syed Ahmad Aljunied (d. 1859) was a Muslim scholar and khatib of the Shafi'i school, serving under the Kathiri. He was a student of the Ash'ari theologian Ibn Taher and later a student of the Athari theologian and Hadith scholar, Al-Shawkani. Syed Ahmad Aljunied was also a prominent authority amongst the Shafi'ites of Yemen, narrating Hadith and writing his own compilations of Hadith for the benefit of the Muslim public. He died in 1859 and was buried in the Zanbal Cemetery of Tarim, Yemen.

== Legacy ==
In Singapore, the Aljunied neighbourhood as well its adjoining MRT station on the East–West line are named after the Aljunieds. An annual festival and feast, known as Haul Akbar, is held in Masjid Omar Kampong Melaka to commemorate the deceased Aljunieds. The modernized Aljunieds are also well-known for their textile business, Toko Aljunied, which is centred in Kampong Glam, near the Sultan Mosque.

== See also ==
- Alsagoff family
- Alkaff family
