= Masjid Omar Kampong Melaka =

Historic mosque of Singapore

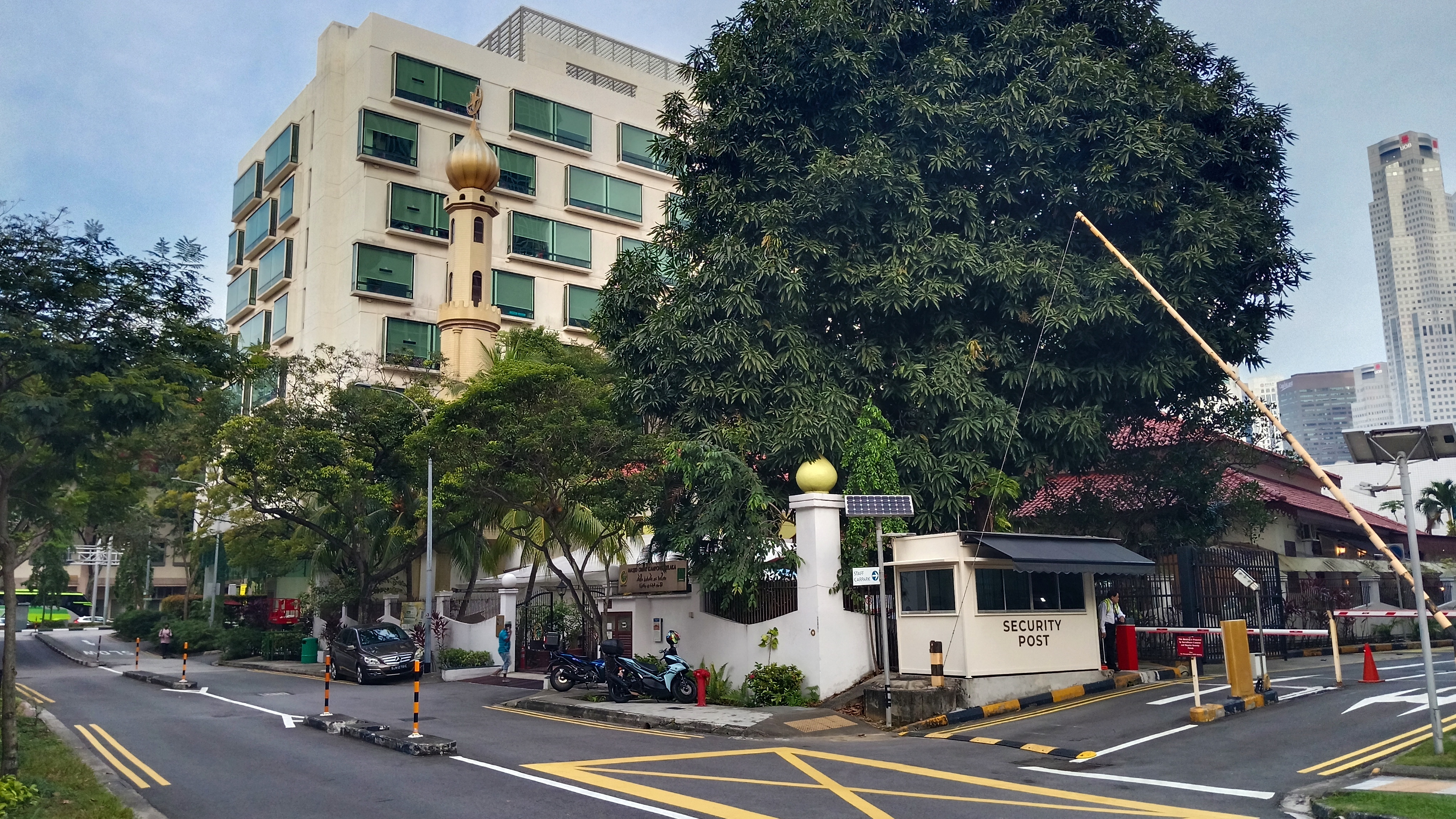

- Location in Singapore

Religion
- Affiliation: Sunni Islam

Location
- Location: 10 Keng Cheow Street, Singapore 059607
- Country: Singapore
- Interactive map of Masjid Omar Kampong Melaka
- Coordinates: 1.2877787°N 103.8442688°E

Architecture
- Type: Mosque
- Style: Malay architecture
- Founder: Syed Omar Aljunied
- Established: 1820
- Completed: 1820; 1985 (Reconstruction)
- Minaret: 1
- Designated as NHL

National monument of Singapore
- Designated: 11 November 2001; 24 years ago
- Reference no.: 59

Masjid Omar Kampong Melaka (Jawi: مسجد عمر كامبونغ ميلاكا) is a historic mosque located along Keng Cheow Street and off Havelock Road in Chinatown, Singapore. Built in 1820 by Syed Omar Aljunied, it holds historical significance as the very first mosque to be established in the country, predating even Masjid Sultan. It is a national heritage monument of Singapore, holding 59th place in the overall registry.

== History ==
The mosque was originally a timber structure built by Syed Omar Aljunied in 1820. It served as a meeting place for the local Muslim communities in the area, which included Arabs, Malays, and Jawi Peranakans. The wooden mosque was demolished and then completely rebuilt from the ground up as a brick structure in 1855 with funding from an heir of Syed Omar Aljunied. The mosque underwent several renovations throughout the early 1980s which saw an expansion of the main prayer hall and the addition of an administration building for mosque personnel and volunteers. The minaret of the mosque was only added in 1985 after previous renovations had been completed. Later in 2009, the mosque received an extensive upgrade which replaced the roof of the mosque as well as the introduction of a madrasah annex and a new prayer hall for female worshippers.

Masjid Omar Kampong Melaka was gazetted as the national monument on the 11th of November 2001 by the National Heritage Board, holding the 59th place in the list. It is one of five national monuments of Singapore that are mosques, the other being Masjid Sultan, Masjid Hajjah Fatimah, Masjid Al-Abrar, Masjid Abdul Gaffoor, Masjid Jamae Chulia, and the most recent addition to this list being Masjid Alkaff Upper Serangoon.

== Significance ==
The mosque holds historical significance as being the first ever mosque to be built in Singapore that still survives to this very day. This is followed by Masjid Sultan of Kampong Glam; built in 1826, which is subsequently followed by Masjid Hajjah Fatimah; built in 1845. Aside for being significant due to its position as being the first mosque in Singapore, it is also regarded as a landmark of the Aljunied family, whom the founder of the mosque belonged to. Several members of the Aljunied family, including the founder himself, are buried right outside the mosque at a corner of the courtyard in a private cemetery.

== Gallery ==
=== General views ===
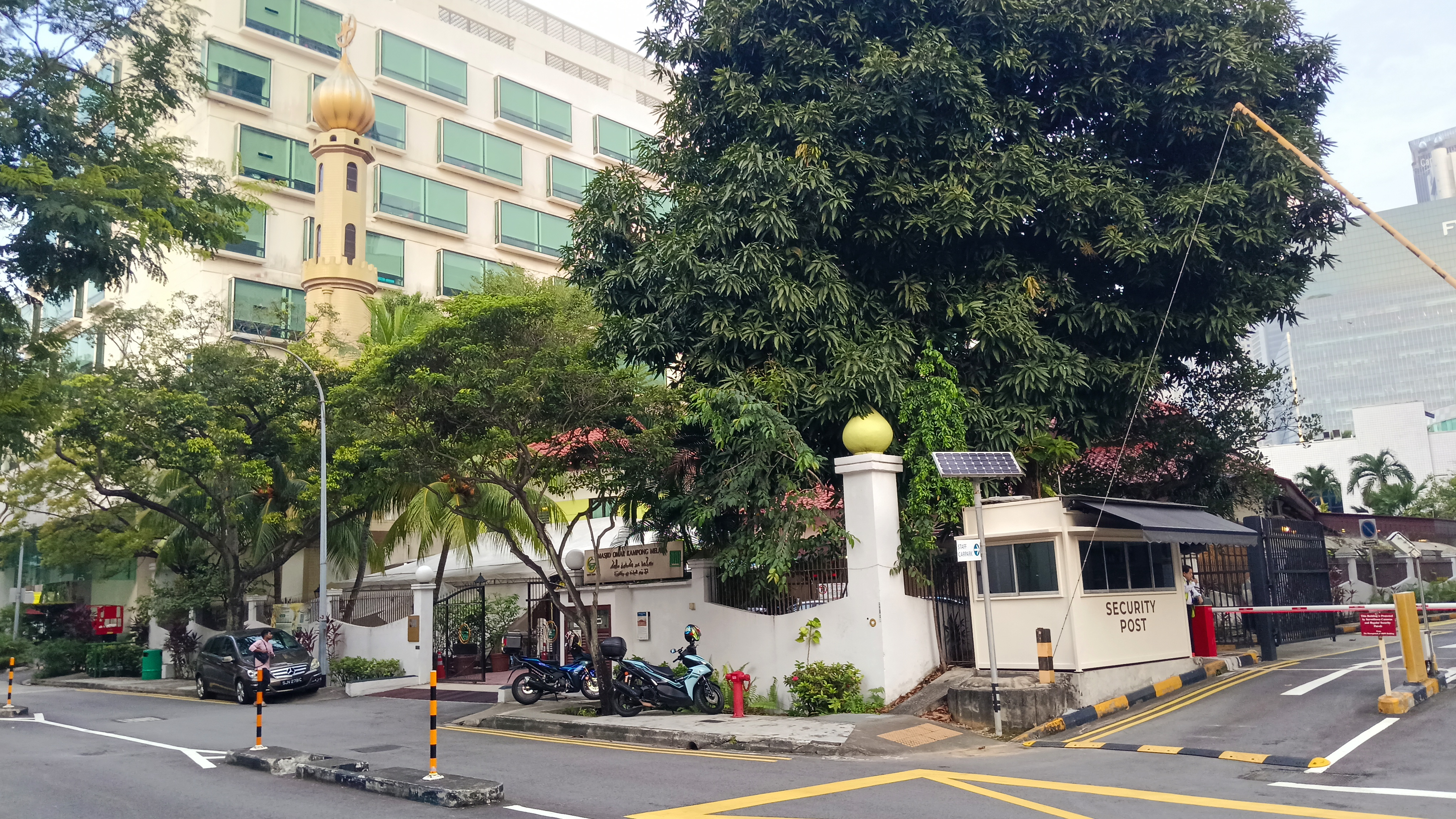
The mosque as seen from across Keng Cheow Street.

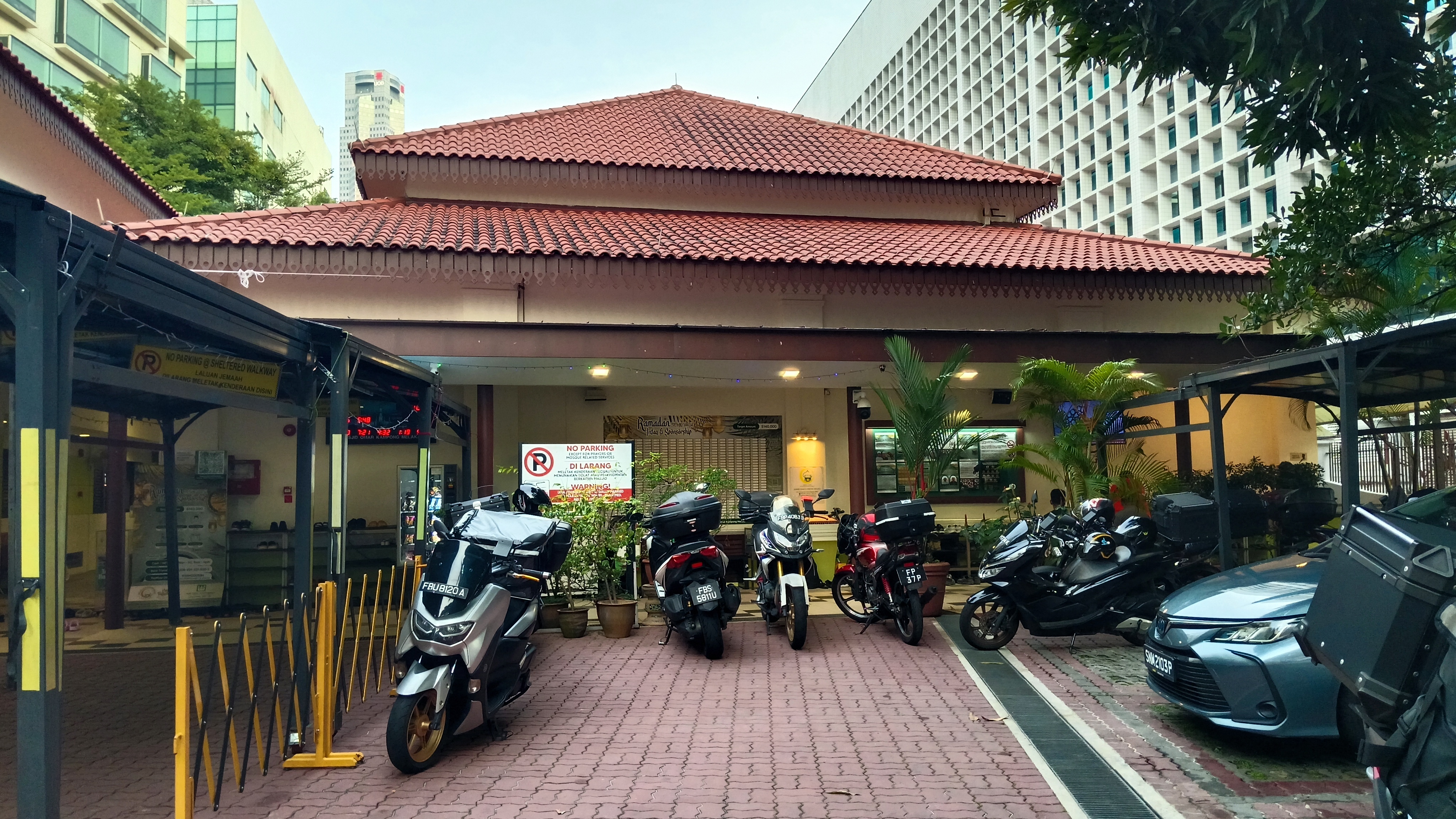
The main building of the mosque during Ramadan.

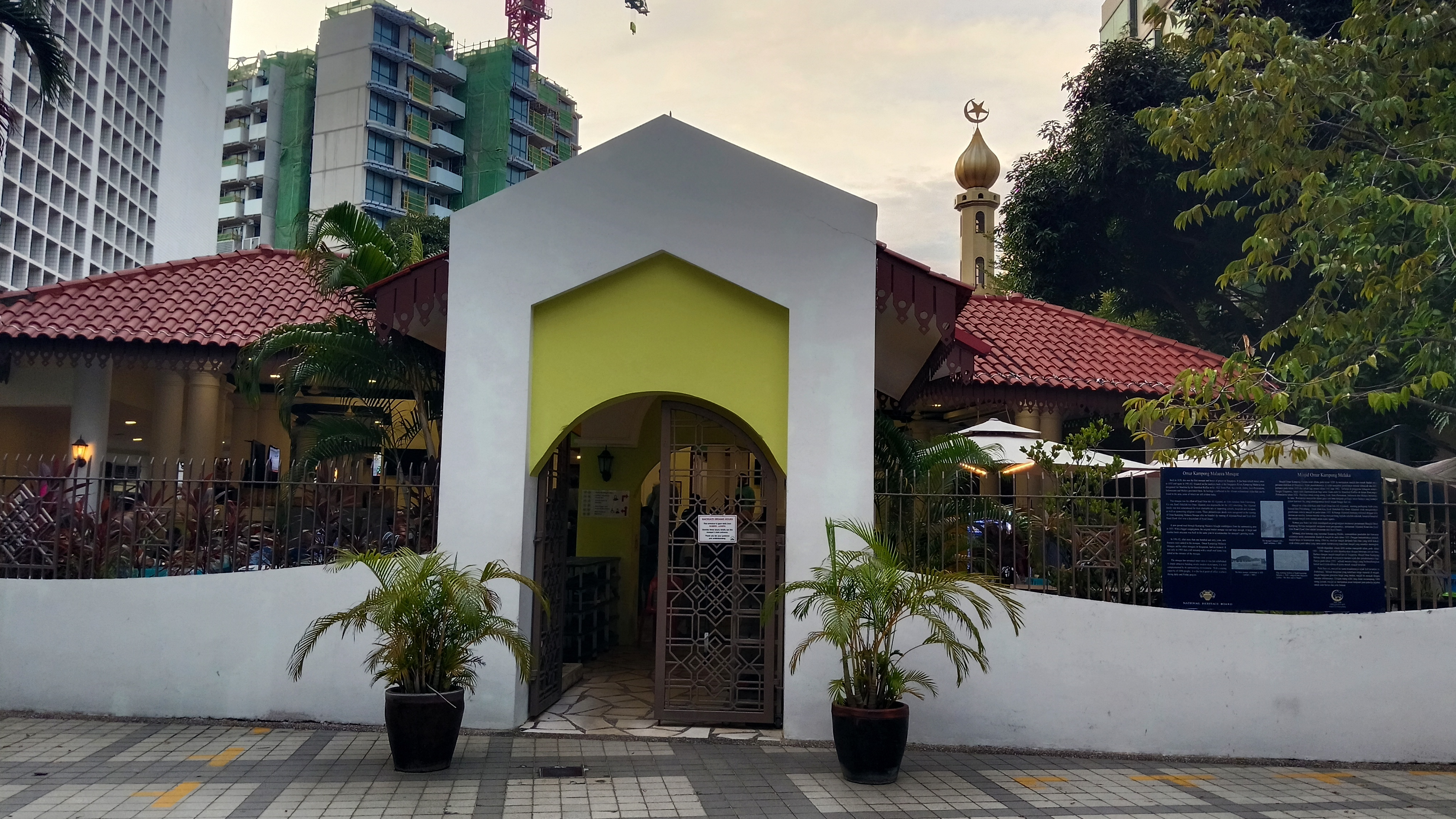
Back entrance of the mosque that faces industrial buildings along New Market Road.

=== Minaret ===
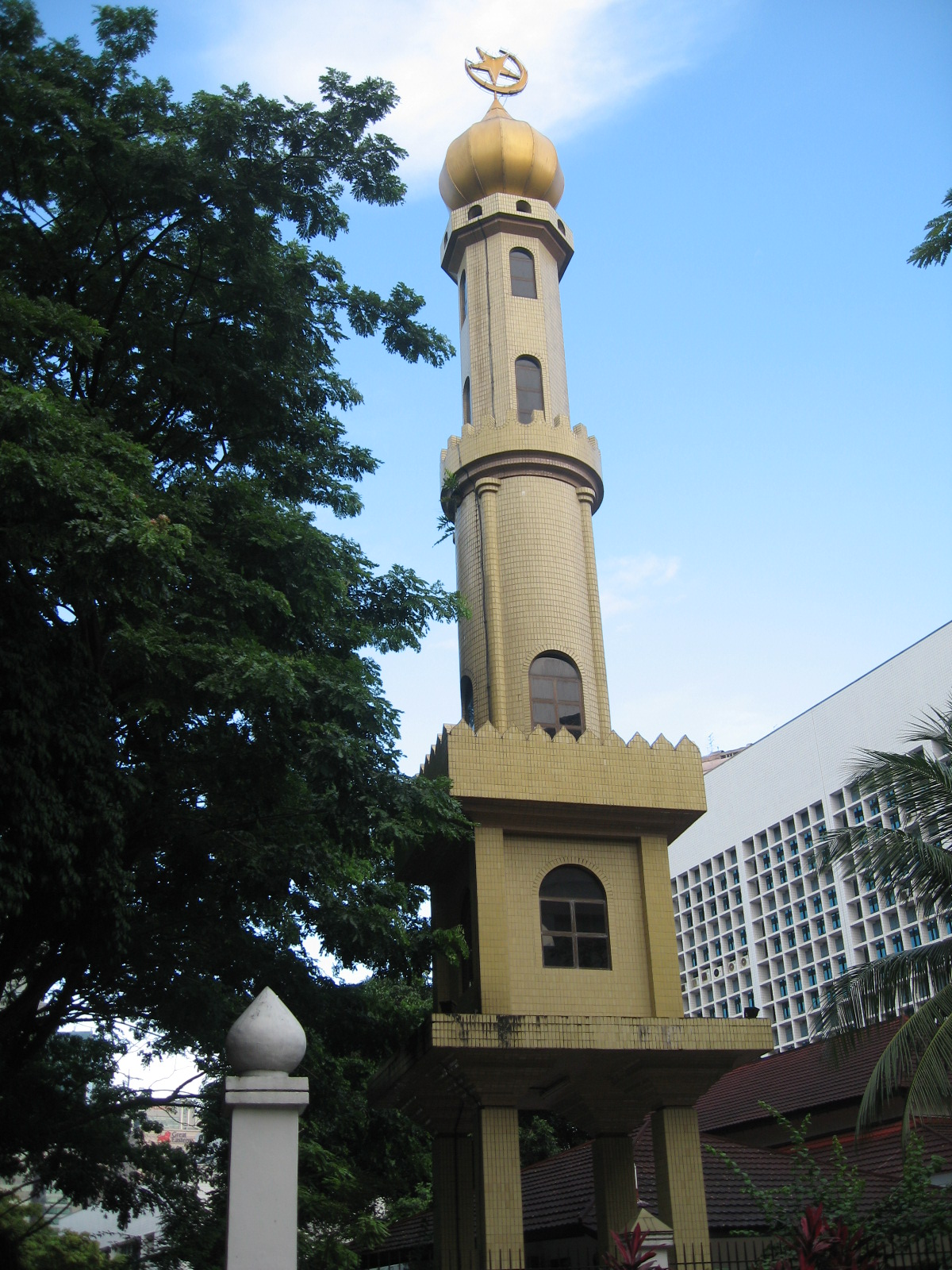
The minaret in 2006.

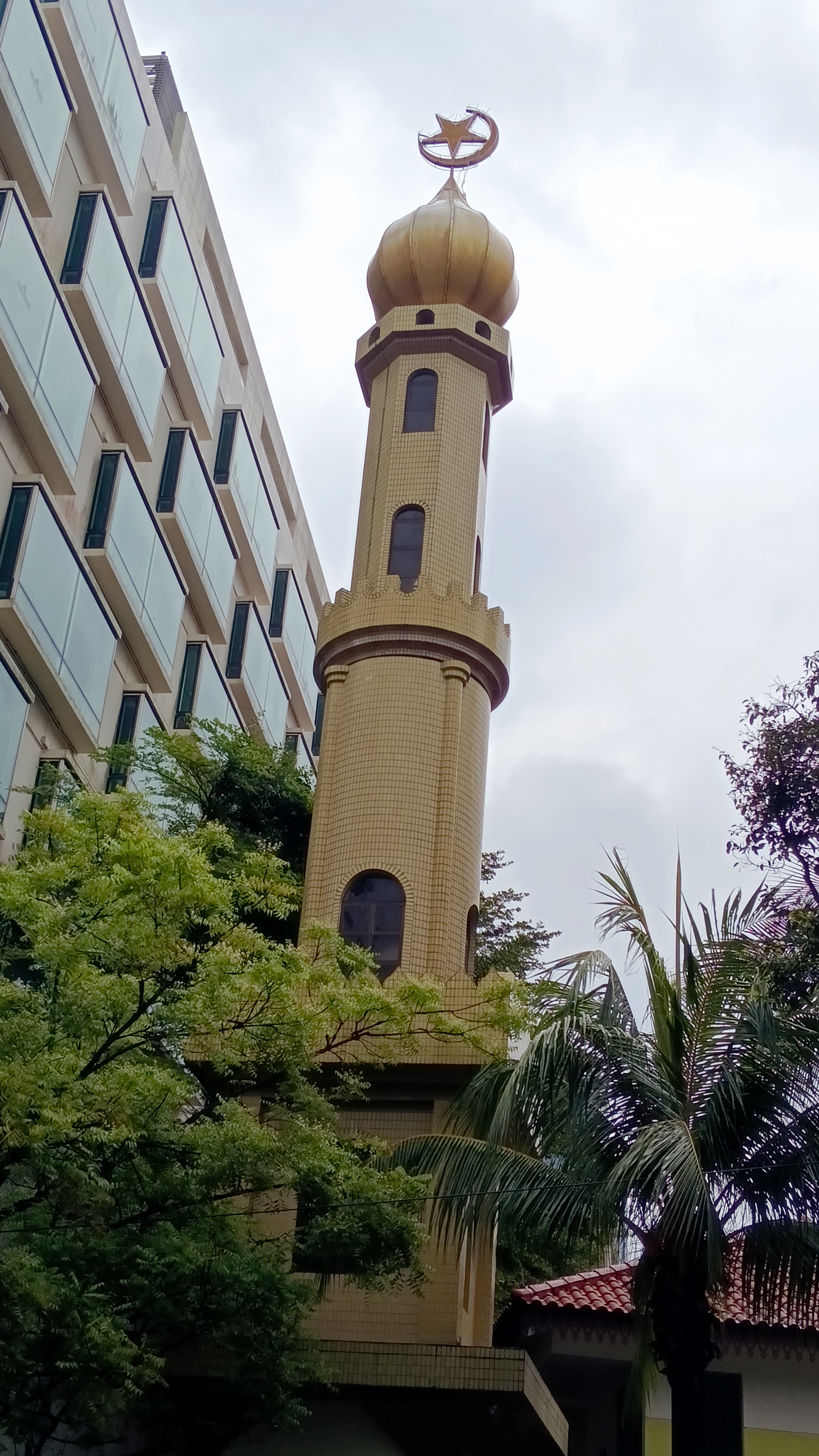
The minaret in 2025, with the yellow colours more prominent.

=== Interior ===
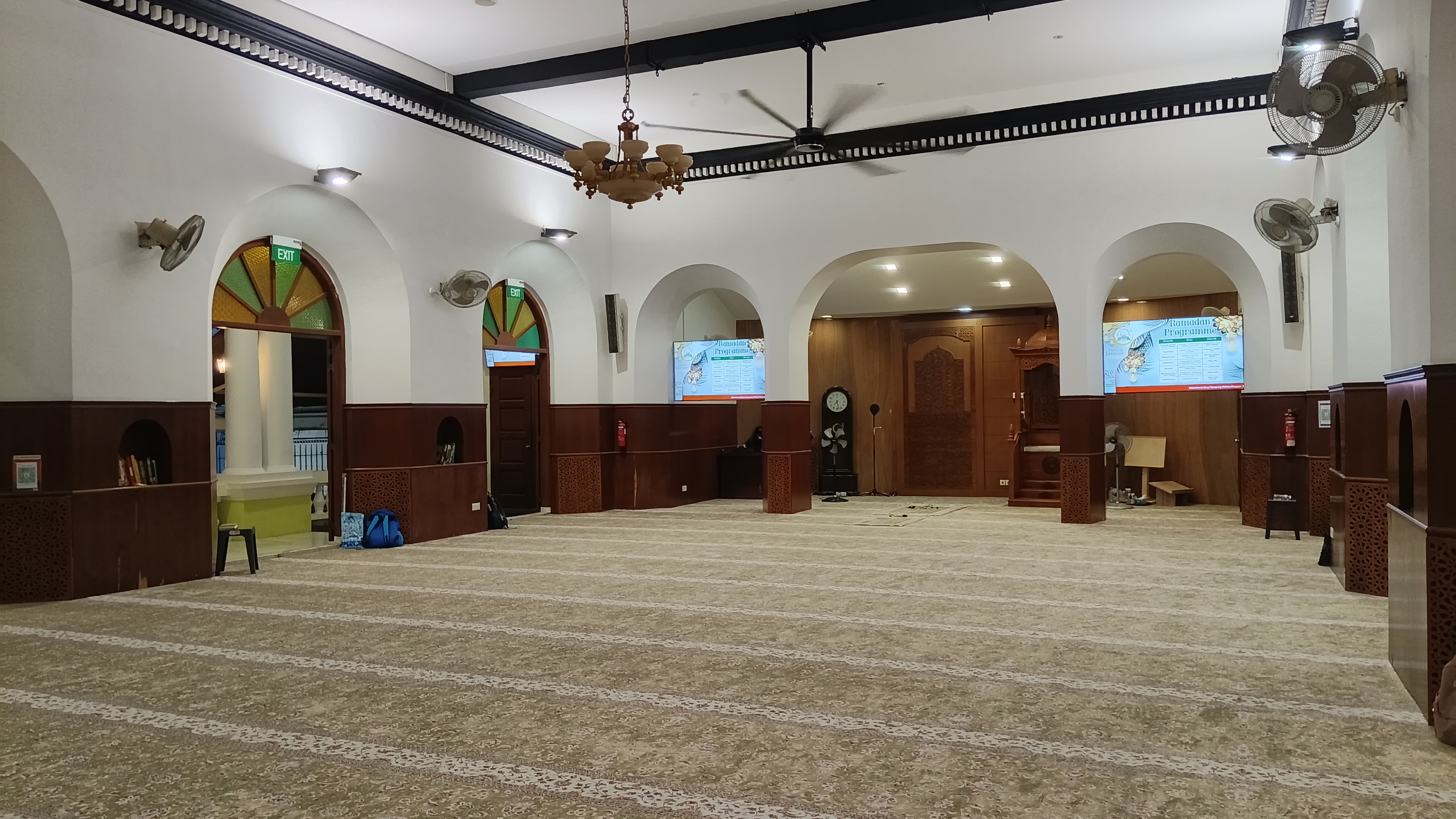
Main prayer hall of the mosque.

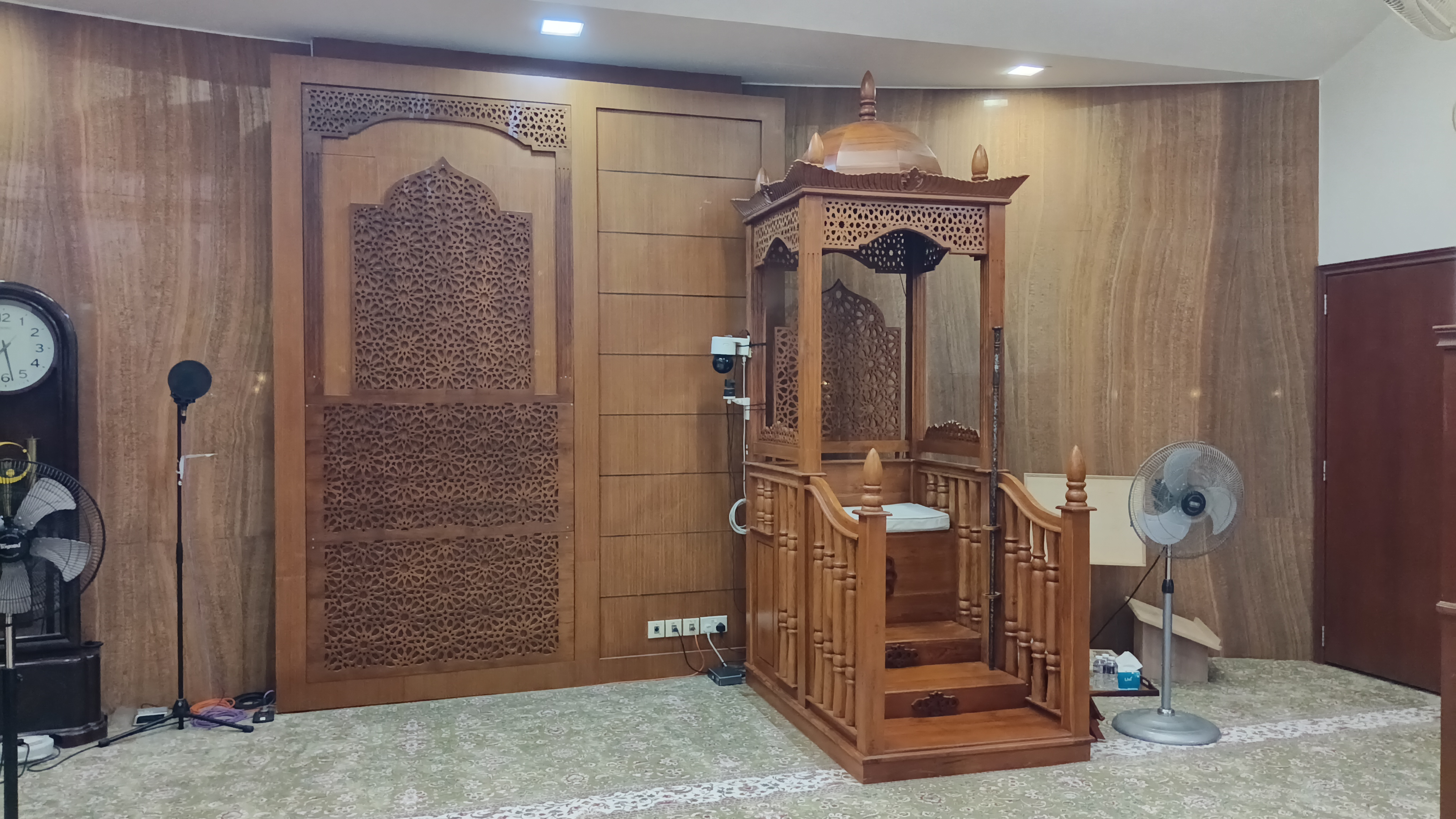
The minbar of the mosque where the khatib stands on to give to Friday sermon.

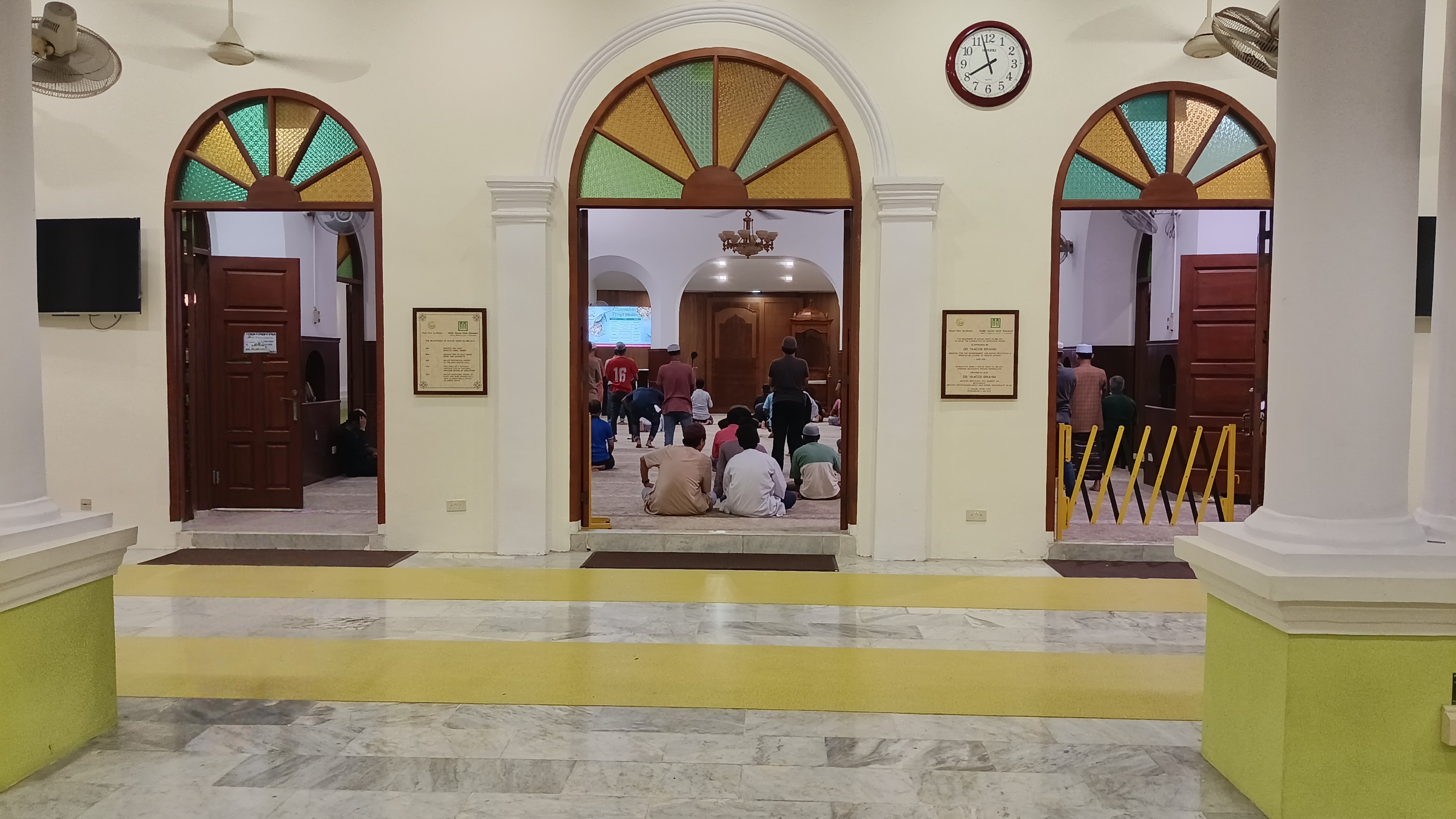
Facade of the interior with three entrances to the main prayer hall.

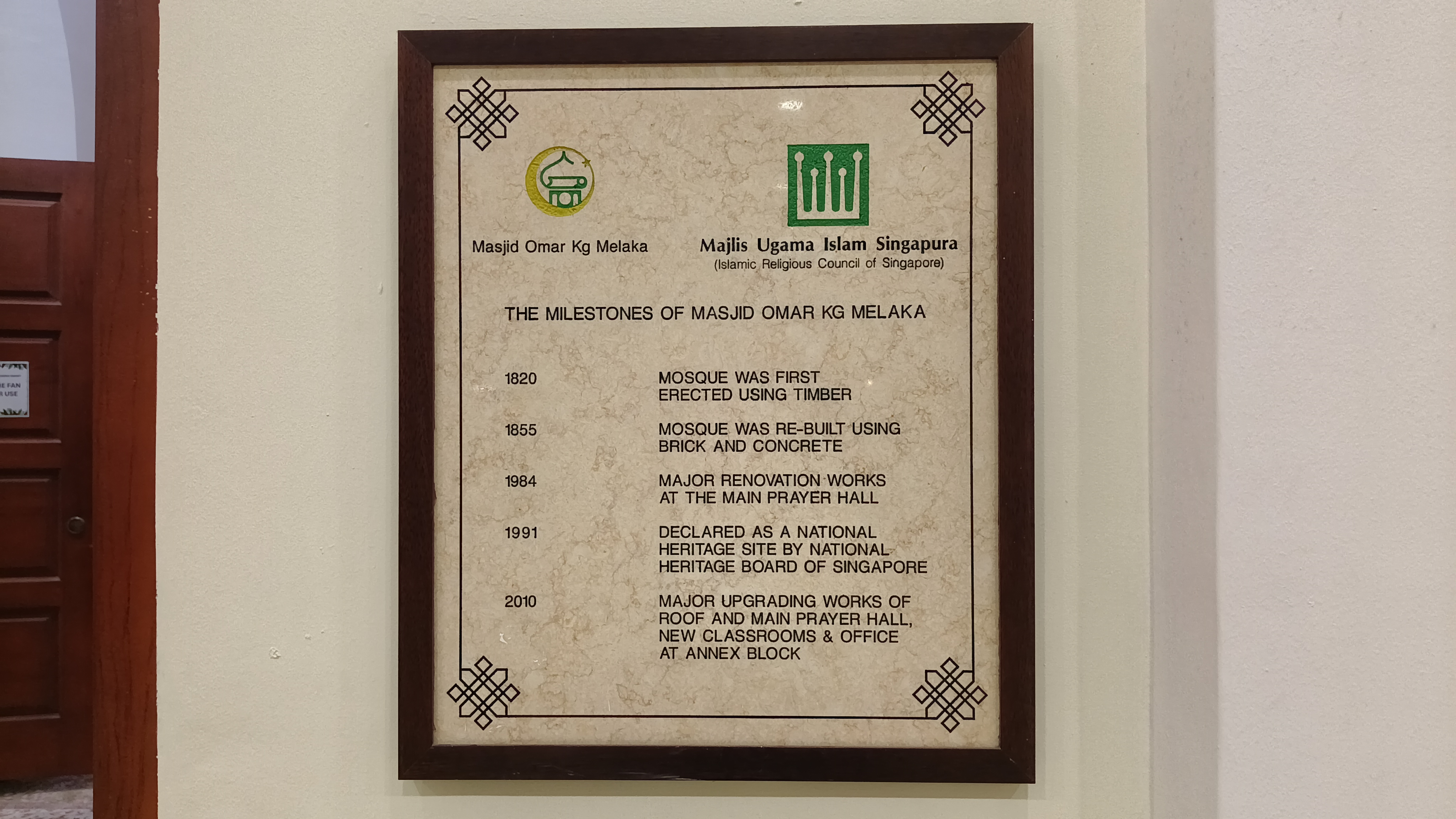
Signboard showing history of the mosque.

=== Miscellaneous ===
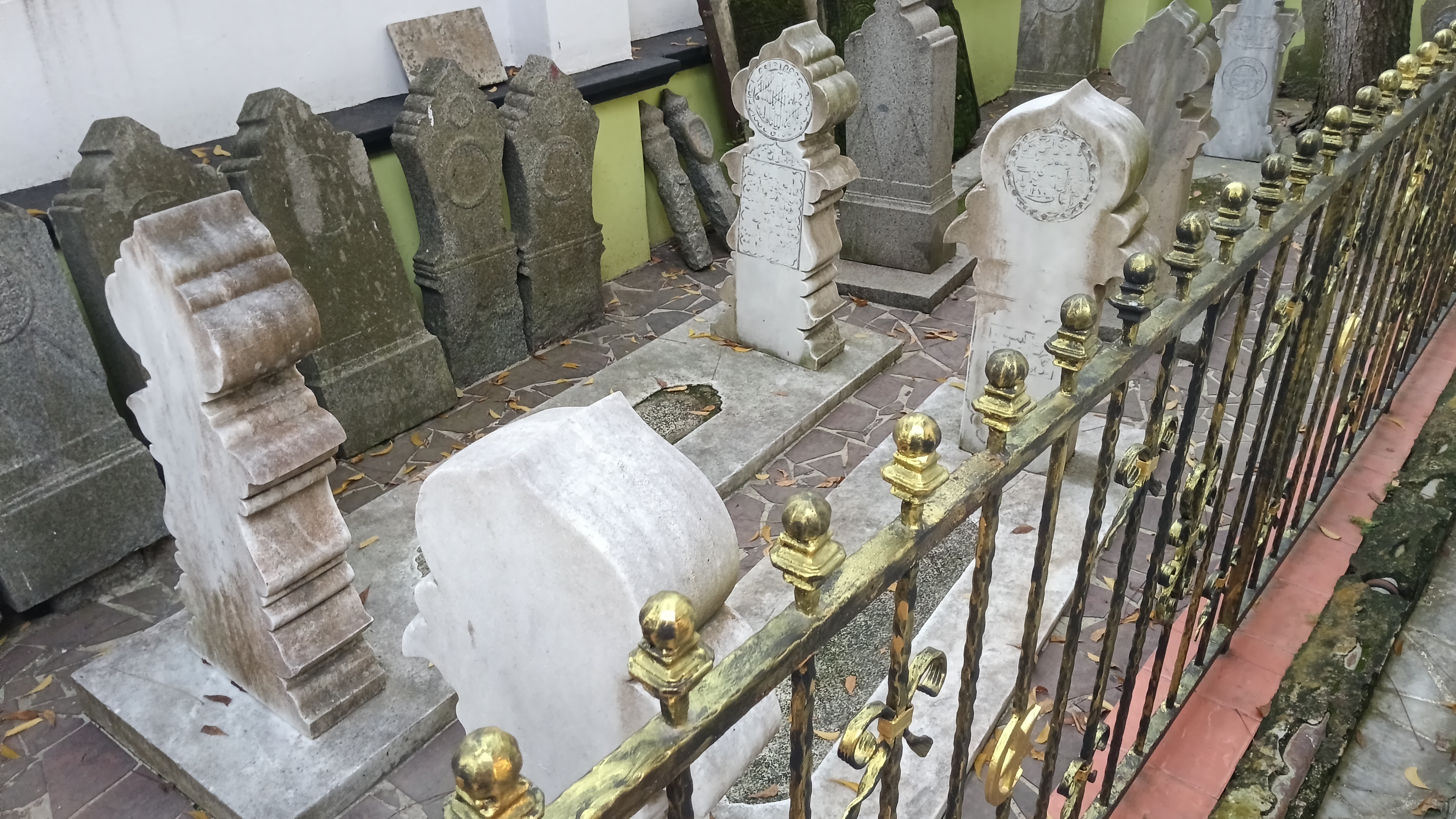
The burial ground of the Aljunied family, located in a corner of the courtyard outside the mosque.

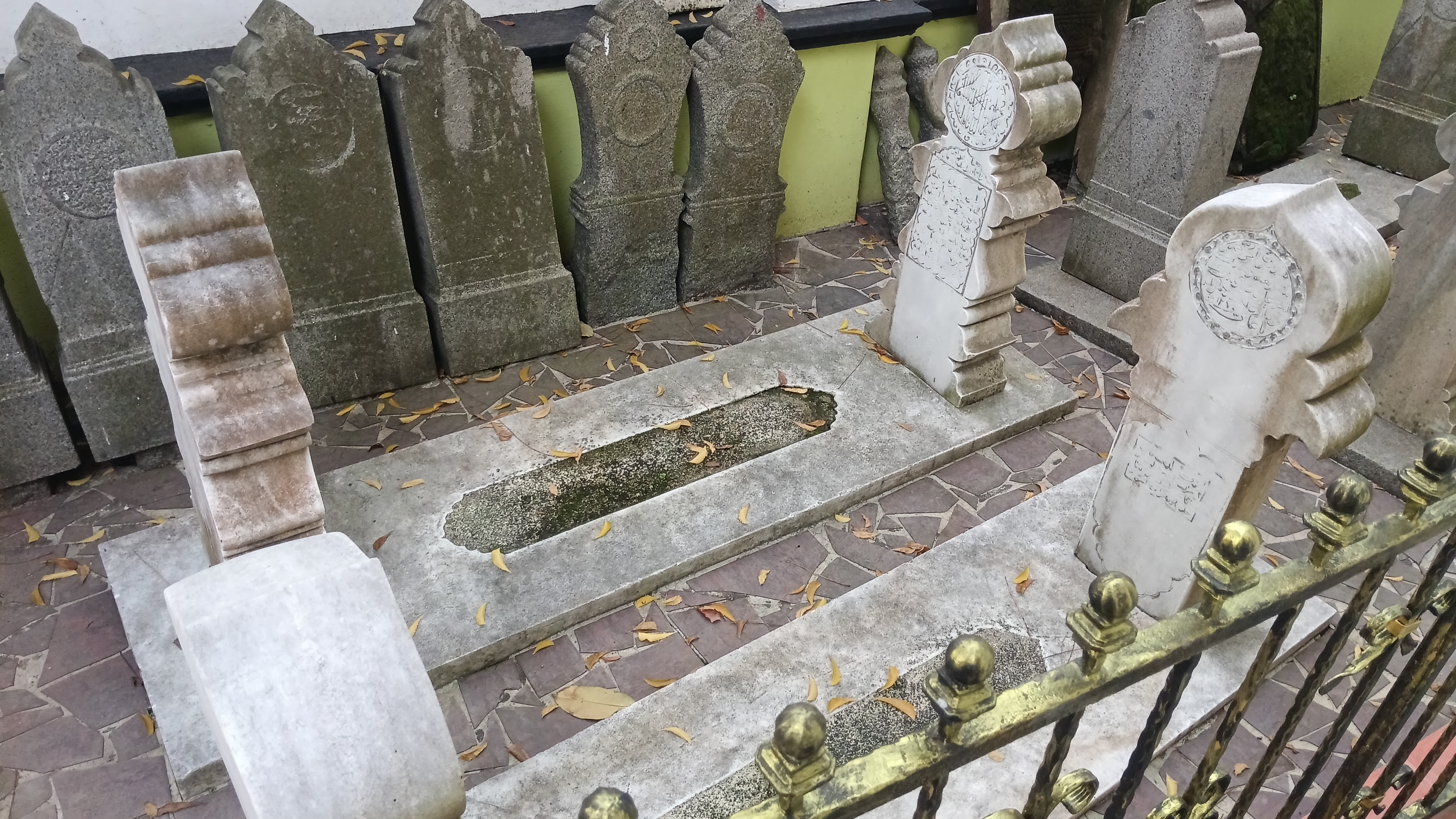
The tomb of Syed Omar Aljunied and his ancestor, Syed Haroon.

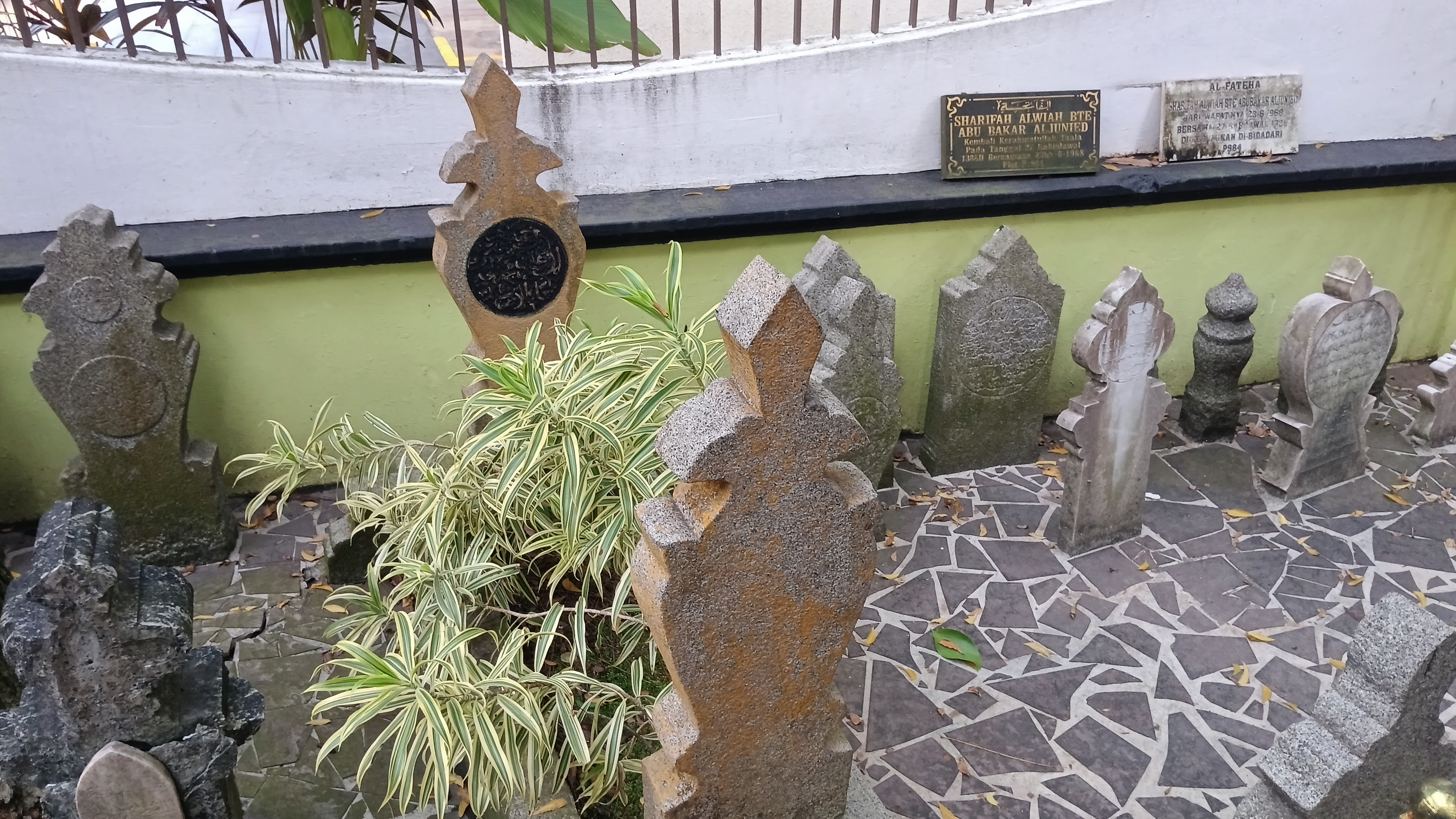
A tomb belonging to an unidentified personage.

== Transportation ==
Masjid Omar Kampong Melaka is within walking distance from the Clarke Quay MRT station. Bus services 51, 143 and 186 also lead to the condominium complex that is located opposite the mosque and connect it to the neighborhoods of Hougang, Jurong East and Shenton Way. The mosque is also located off Havelock Road and hence is adjacent to the Furama City Centre which can be accessed from the Downtown Line exit of Chinatown MRT station.

== See also ==
- Islam in Singapore
- List of mosques in Singapore
