= Masjid Malabar =

Mosque located in Kampong Glam, Singapore

Malabar Mosque மலாபார் மசூதி
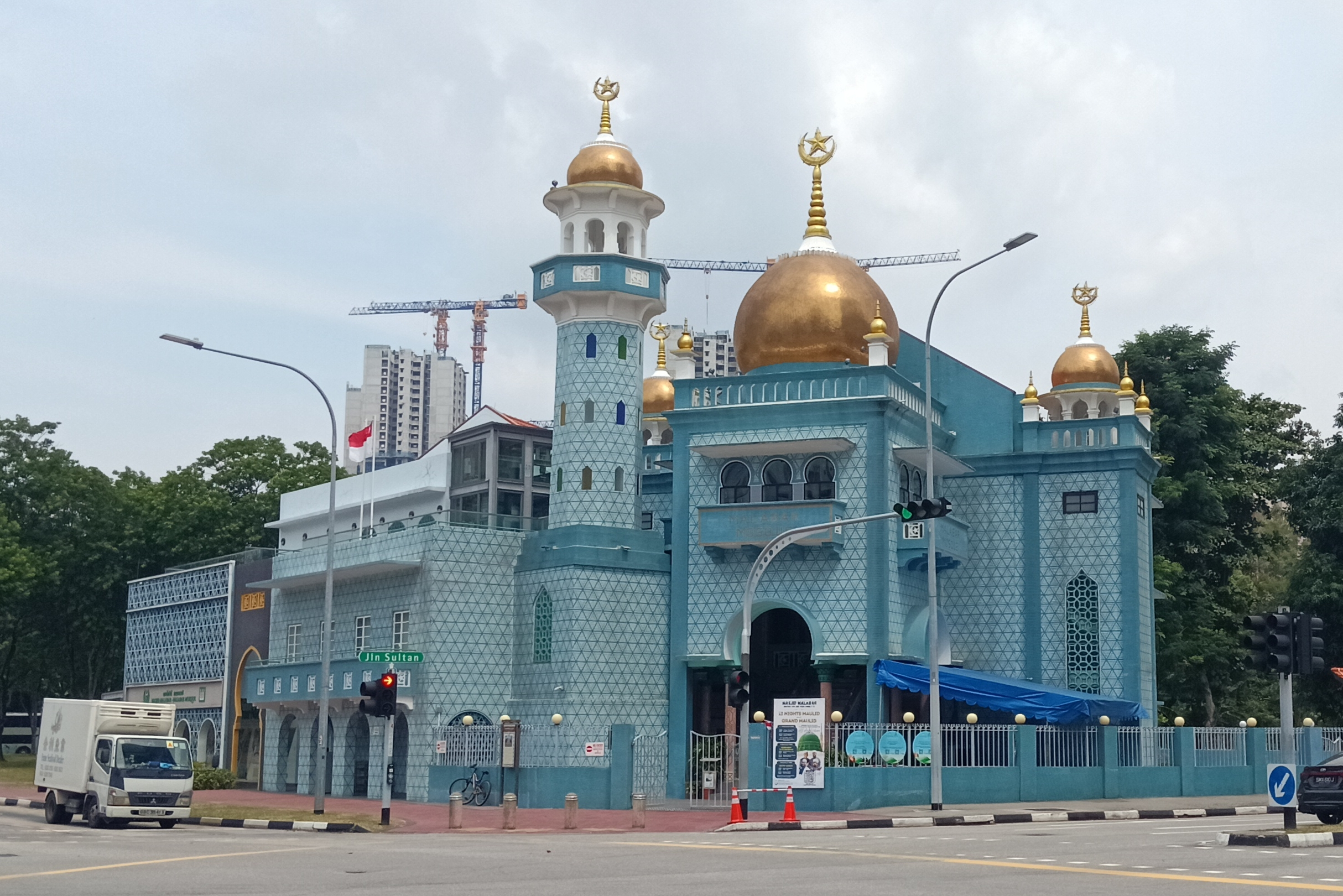

- Location in Singapore

Religion
- Affiliation: Sunni Islam

Location
- Location: 471 Victoria Street, Singapore 198370
- Country: Singapore
- Coordinates: 1.3050899°N 103.8597357°E

Architecture
- Architect: A.H. Siddique
- Type: Mosque
- Style: Indo-Saracenic architecture Mughal architecture
- Completed: 1963

Specifications
- Minaret: 1
- Minaret height: 2.0 m

The Malabar Mosque (Tamil: மலாபார் மசூதி, Malay: Masjid Malabar), also known as the Blue Mosque, is a historic mosque located at the junction of Victoria Street and Jalan Sultan in the Kampong Glam district of Rochor, Singapore. Built in 1963 by South Indian immigrants, it is managed by the local Malabar Muslim Jama'ath and is recognizable for its predominately blue exterior and golden dome.

== Etymology ==
The word "Malabar" refers to South Indian immigrants from the Malabar Coast of Kerala. The majority of Malabaris adhere to Hinduism and Islam, with the Malabar Muslims following the Shāfi'ī school of thought. The mosque is alternatively known as the Blue Mosque, making it one of two mosques in the country to have that name, the other being Masjid An-Nur.

== History ==
The Malabar Muslim Jama'at, an Indian Muslim organization, was founded in 1927 by the Malabar Muslims, a group of Indian Muslim immigrants from Kerala. Soon, the Malabaris realized the need to have their own mosque in the country, and a plot of land along Victoria Street was chosen in the 1950s. This plot of land contained an old Indian Muslim burial ground, known as the Tittacheri Muslim Cemetery, which was regarded by colonial authorities to have been the only one of the three cemeteries in the best condition at Jalan Kubor. A foundation stone was laid at the site in 1956 with a ceremony attended to by government officials from both Singapore and the nearby Sultanate of Johor. Construction on the exterior of the mosque was completed in 1958. However, the mosque was officially opened to the public on 24 January 1963 by Yusof Ishak, who was then the Yang di-Pertuan Negara of Singapore.

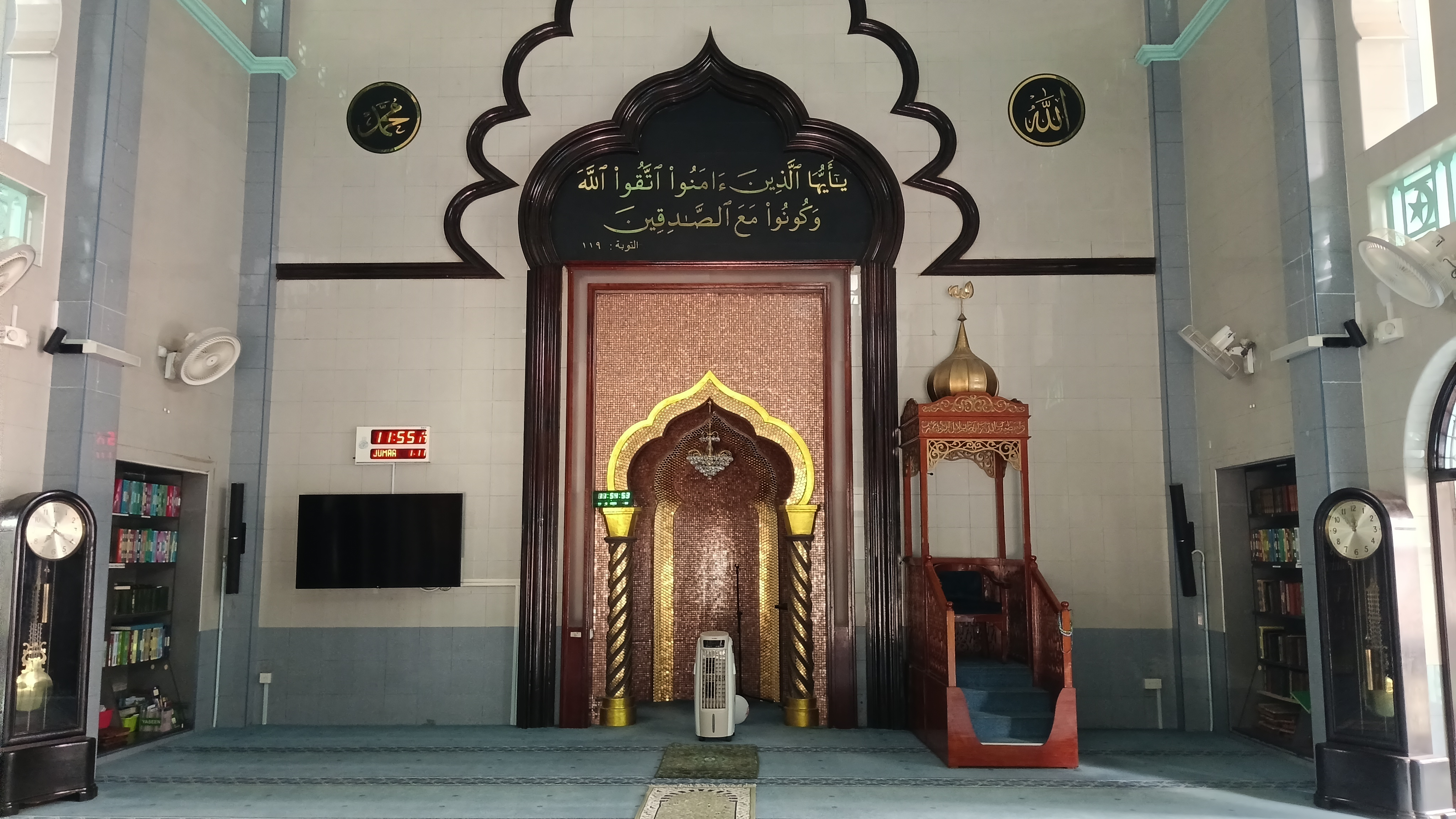
Interior of the Malabar Mosque, with mihrab and minbar visible.

In 2018, the committee of the Malabar Mosque discussed buying land around the mosque in order to construct a three-storey annexe building that houses a madrasah, female prayer space, heritage gallery, as well as an auditorium hall. Locals in the Rochor area expressed worries that the planned renovation, which included the construction of the aforementioned annexe, would result in the exhumation of graves in the nearby burial grounds along Jalan Kubor. Conservation efforts were made for graves in the vicinity, which included the tombs of Muslim religious leader Kunhi Koya Thangal and Bugis entrepreneur Ambo Sooloh. Starting in late 2020, the renovation project took three years and the Malabar Mosque was reopened on 29 July 2023.

== Architecture ==
The Malabar Mosque is built in a traditional, Mughal architectureal style with elements from Indo-Saracenic architecture. It was designed by A.H. Siddique, an architect who also designed a Sikh gurdwara along nearby Wilkinson Road. The notable features of the mosque are the predominately blue exterior and the golden onion-shaped domes atop the mosque. The mosque has a single two-metre minaret, topped by a golden dome. The exterior of the mosque is coated with Lapis lazuli tiles that were installed in 1995. After the renovation, the mosque can accommodate 1,400 worshippers and occupies an area of 1,242 square metres.

The main prayer hall of the mosque is located on the second level and is accessible via a flight of stairs at the entrance. The male ablution area and a multi-purpose hall are on the same level as the main prayer hall, while the female prayer hall overlooks the main one and is situated on the third level. The overall layout of the mosque is diagonal in order to face Mecca, the direction of prayer for Muslims.

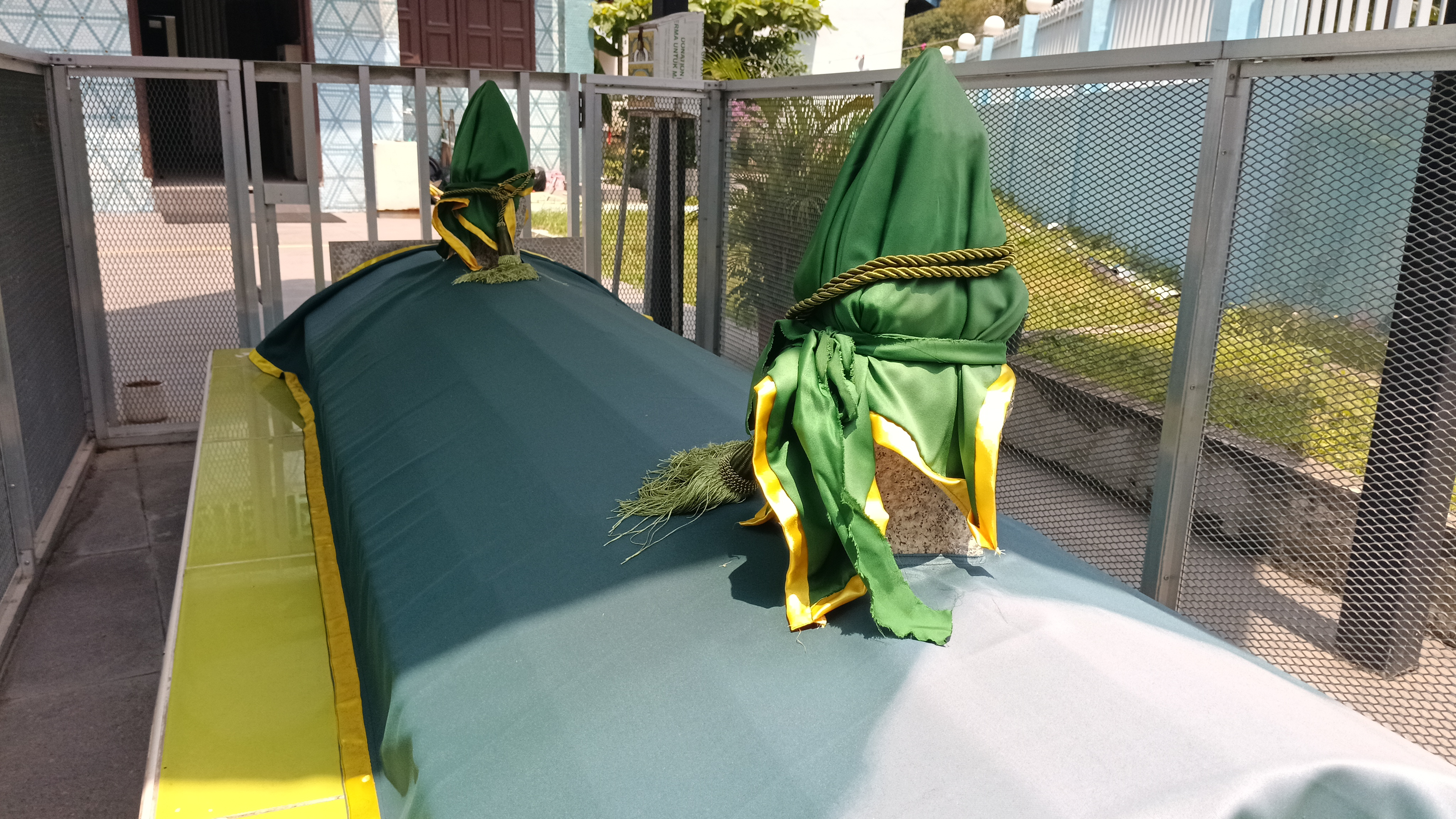
The tomb of Sayyid Muhammad Kunhi.

In the courtyard of the mosque, towards the side facing Jalan Sultan, are the tombs of several Islamic scholars from the Koya Thangal family of Malabar Muslims, with the most prominent being the cloth-draped tomb of Sayyid Muhammad Kunhi. To the left of the mosque, attached to it, is the grave of the Bugis merchant Ambo Sooloh and a mausoleum which is dedicated to his parents.

A heritage gallery is installed on the southwestern facade of the mosque and is accessible to be public. This gallery details the history of the mosque, as well as the history of the Malabar Muslims in the country, including prominent clerics and Islamic scholars from their community.

== Transportation ==
The Malabar Mosque is accessible from the Bugis MRT station and the Lavender MRT station, which are situated back-to-back on the East–West MRT line.

== See also ==
- List of mosques in Singapore
