= Dover, Singapore =

Dover
- Subzone of Queenstown Planning Area

Other transcription(s)
  - Chinese: 杜弗
  - Pinyin: Dù fú
  - Malay: Dover
  - Tamil: டோவெர்
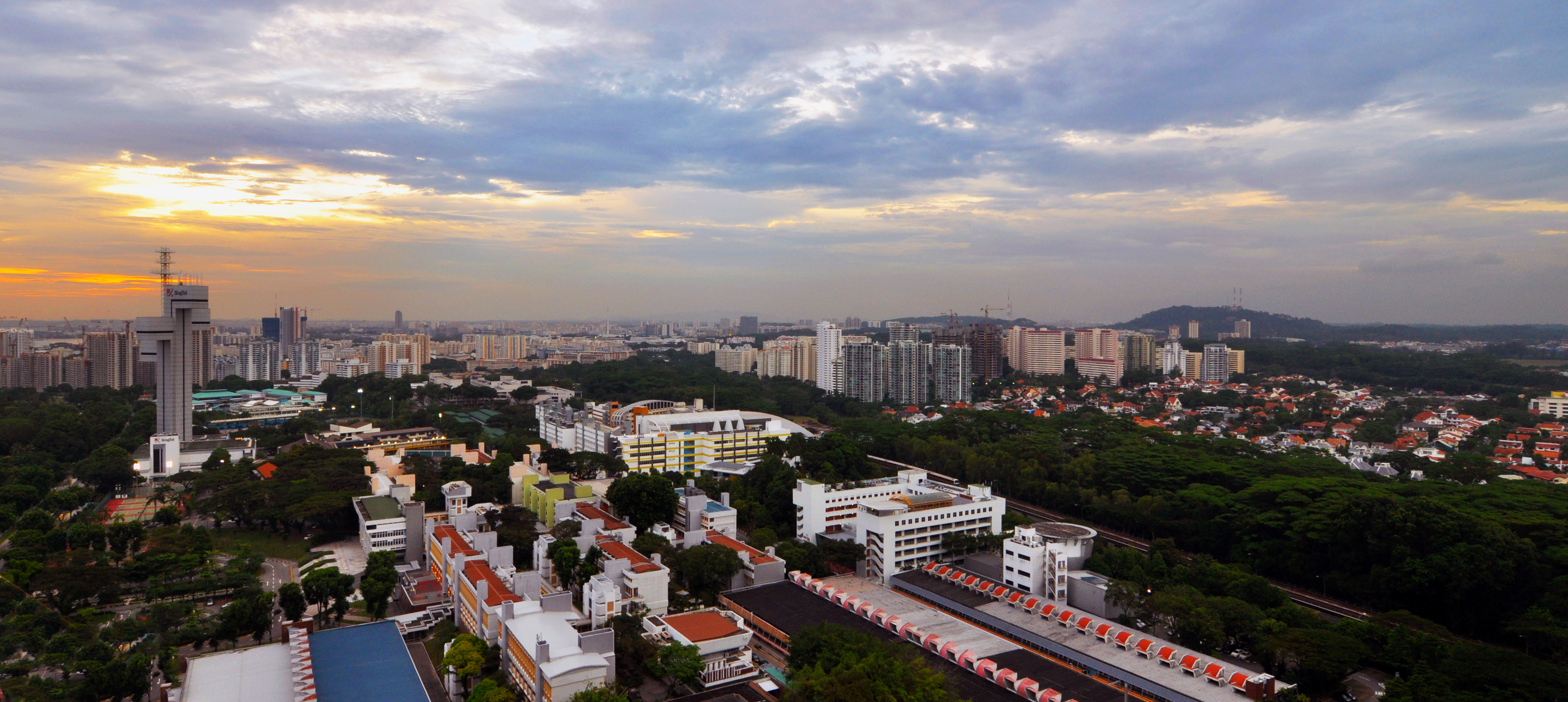
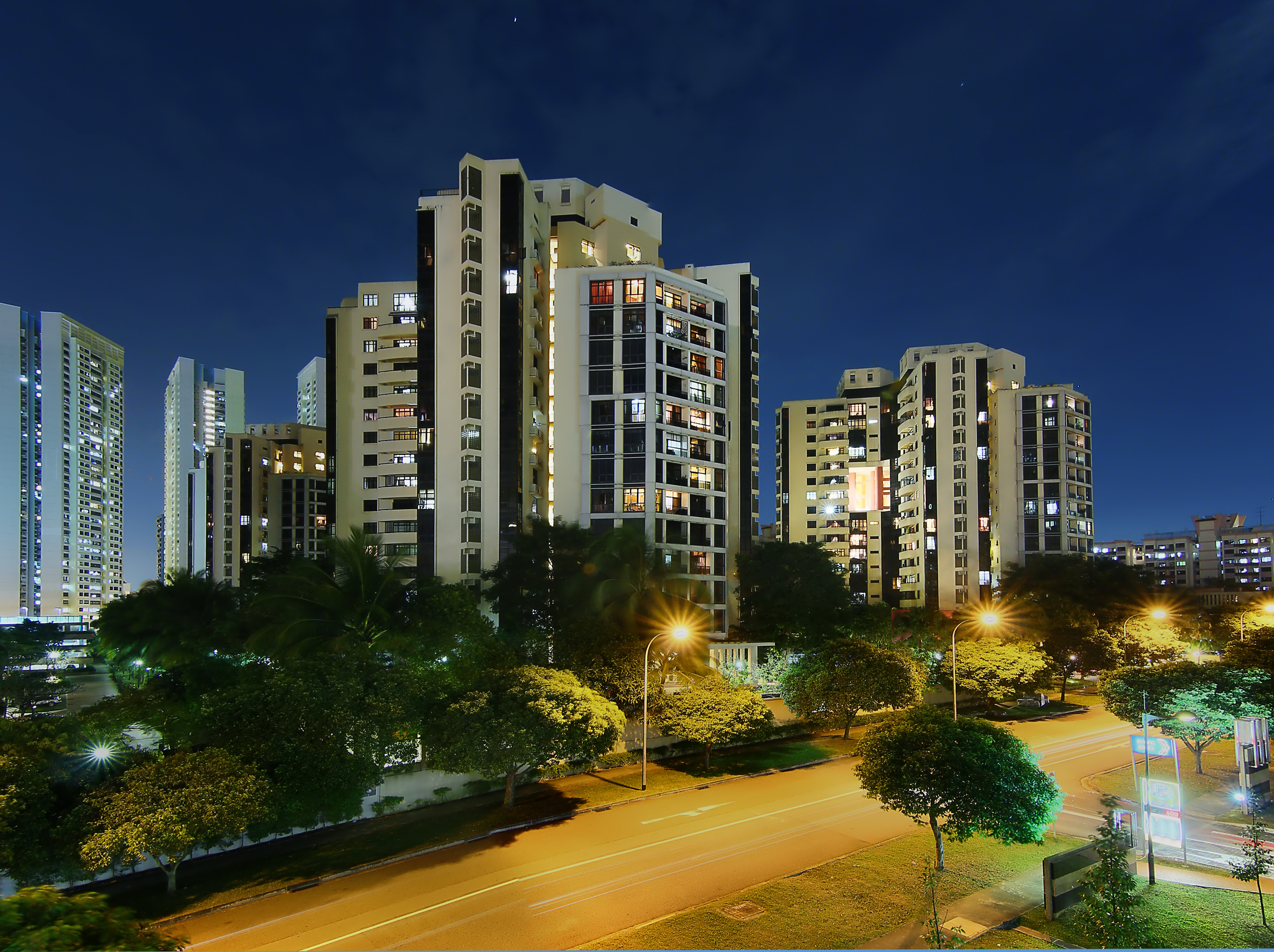
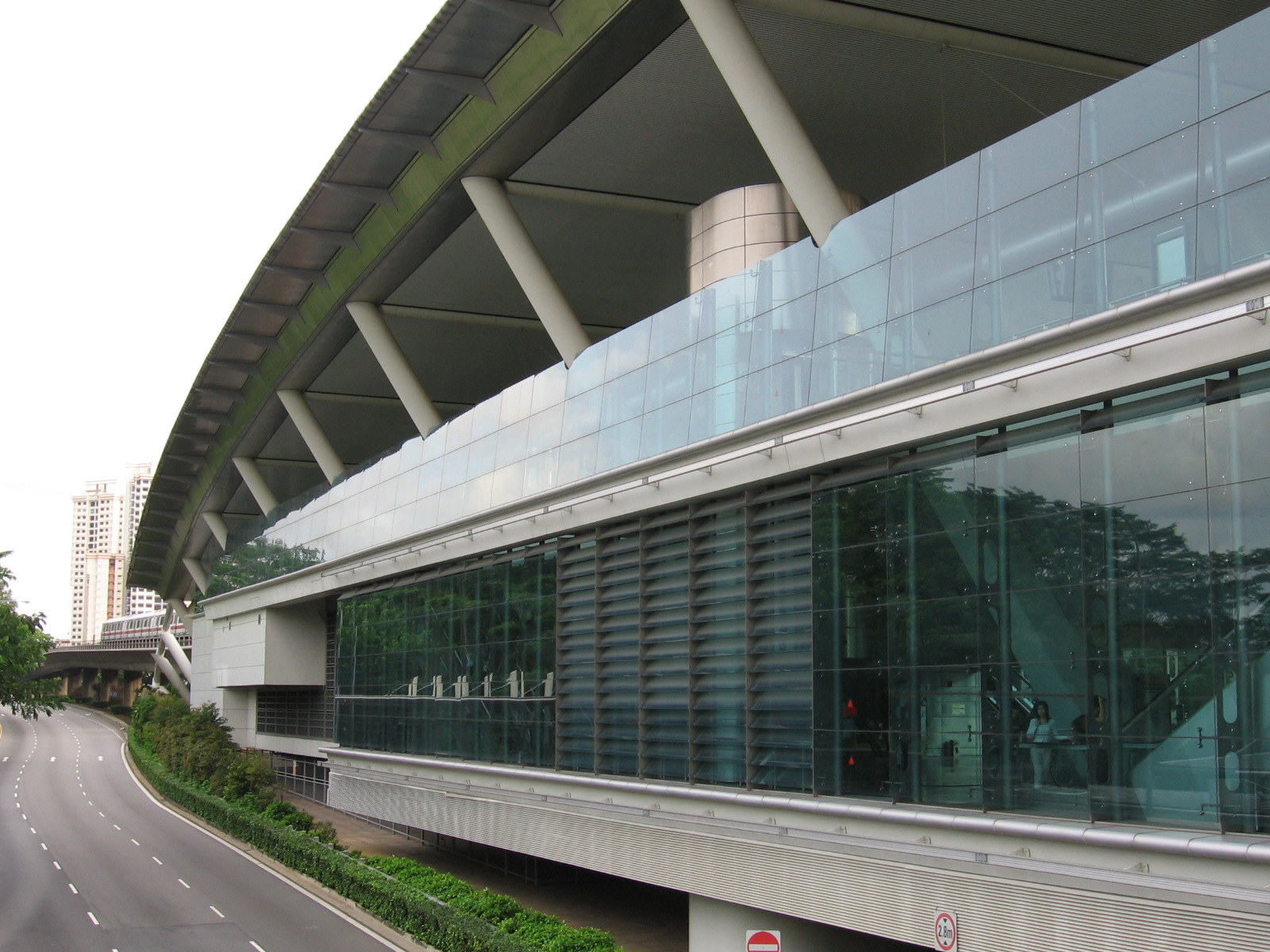
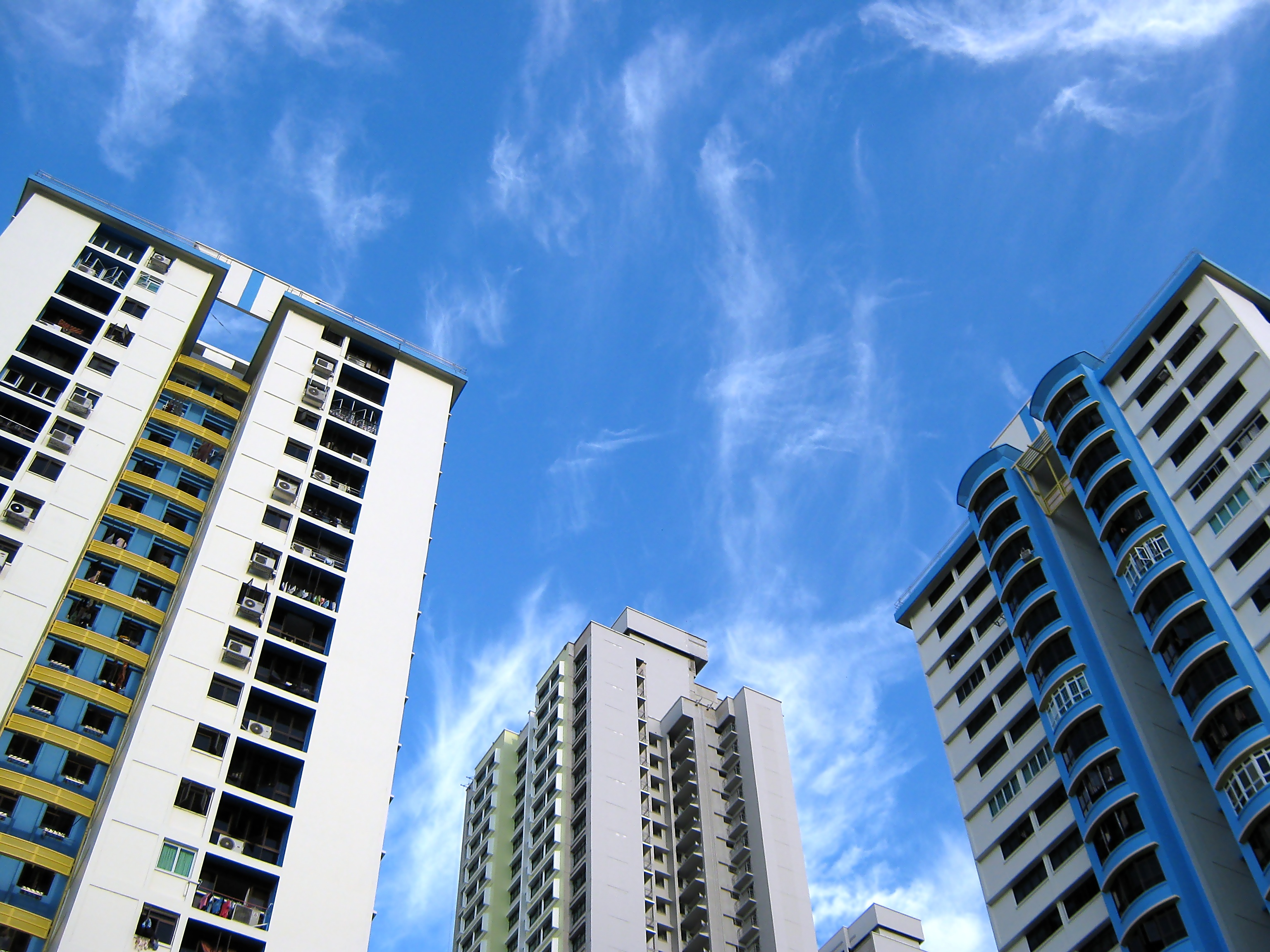
- From top left to right: Panoramic view of Singapore Polytechnic, Dover Parkview, Dover MRT station, Dover Gardens

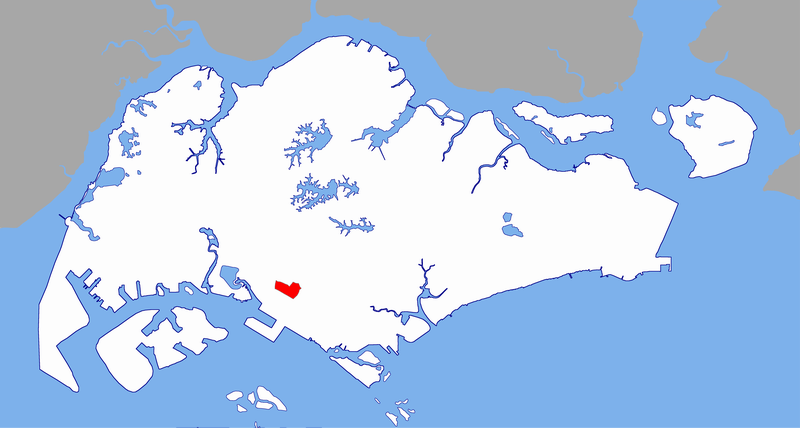

- Location of Dover within Singapore
- Coordinates: 1°18′16.5″N 103°46′49.1″E
- Country: Singapore
- Region: Central Region
- CDC: Central Singapore CDC
- Town council: Tanjong Pagar Town Council
- Constituency: Tanjong Pagar GRC

Government
  - Mayor: Central Singapore CDC: Denise Phua
  - Members of Parliament: Tanjong Pagar GRC: Rachel Ong

Area
  - Total: 1.39 km^{2} (0.54 sq mi)

Population (2017)
  - Total: 11,710
  - Density: 8,420/km^{2} (21,800/sq mi)
- Demonym: Official: Dover resident
- Postal district: 5

Dover is a relatively small neighbourhood of Singapore, located in Queenstown. It is bordered by Ghim Moh to the north, Kent Ridge to the south and southeast, one-north and Queenstown to the east, Commonwealth and Holland Village to the northeast, Clementi to the west and West Coast to the southwest. It is often a noted location due to the sheer number of educational facilities it holds, while lying in a zone between the Central Area and near industrial zone in the vicinity of Jurong.

== Etymology and history ==
The name "Dover" is from the Celtic word meaning "The Waters", alluding to the English Channel. Medway Park, for instance, is named after the River Medway, which marks the middle of Kent. Kent is the English county where the town of Dover, the namesake is located.

== Roads in Dover ==
- Dover Road
- Dover Crescent
- Dover Close East
- Dover Avenue
- Dover Drive
- Dover Rise

== Transport ==
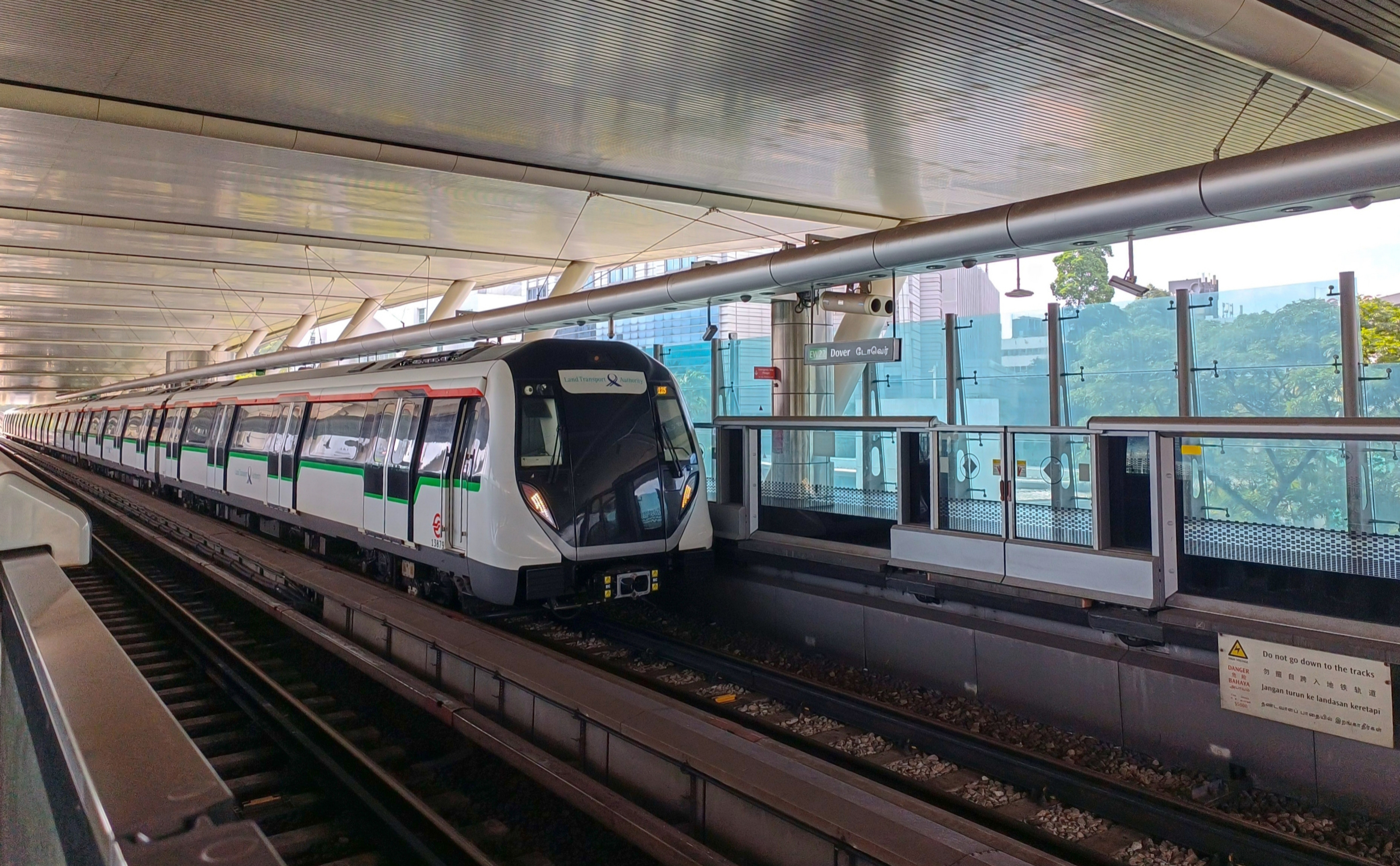
Dover MRT station

There are two Mass Rapid Transit (MRT) stations which are in proximity to Dover. One is Dover MRT station, which is EW22 on the East West MRT line, and the other is Buona Vista MRT station which is EW21/CC22. However, neither MRT station is situated near the heart of Dover. The former is located next to Singapore Polytechnic, whilst the latter at the intersection of North Buona Vista Road and Commonwealth Avenue. A portion of most residents drop at Dover MRT station (East West line) and transfer to a bus (14, 74, 105, 106, 166 or 185), while another portion drop at Buona Vista MRT station (East West line and Circle line), takes a kilometre walk to Dover or transfer to buses 14, 74 or 196. Alternately, one-north MRT station is within walking distance of the eastern end of Dover, although not being located in it.

== Education ==
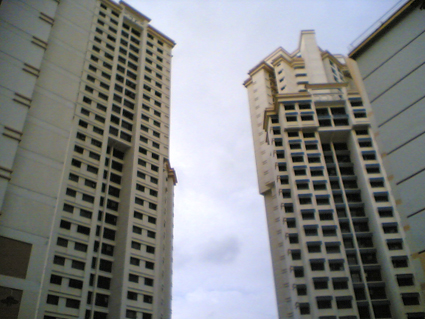
A 32-storey high-rise HDB block in Dover Crescent

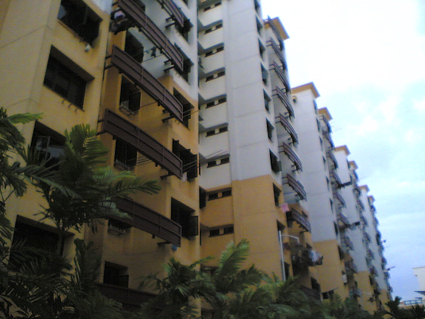
A 12-storey HDB block in Dover Crescent

Dover is known for having many schools and education institutions in its neighbourhood and vicinity.

- Primary schools
  - Fairfield Methodist Primary School
- Secondary schools
  - Anglo-Chinese School (Independent)
  - Fairfield Methodist Secondary School
  - Nan Hua High School
  - New Town Secondary School
  - NUS High School of Math and Science
  - School of Science and Technology, Singapore
- Higher institutions of learning
  - National University of Singapore (NUS) (Kent Ridge)
  - Singapore Polytechnic
  - Anglo-Chinese Junior College
  - INSEAD
- International schools
  - Dover Court International School
  - Japanese Secondary School (Clementi)
  - Norwegian Supplementary School
  - United World College of South East Asia
- Other education institutions
  - Ministry of Education (Singapore)
