= Onh =

ONH or Onh may refer to:

- Óglaigh na hÉireann (Real IRA splinter group), small republican paramilitary group
- Óglaigh na hÉireann, several Irish military organizations
- one-north MRT station, Singapore (MRT station abbreviation)
- Optic Nerve Hypoplasia, medical eye condition
