= Biopolis =

R&D Hub in Singapore

Coordinates: 1°18′09″N 103°47′30″E

Biopolis 启奥城 பயோபோலிஸ்
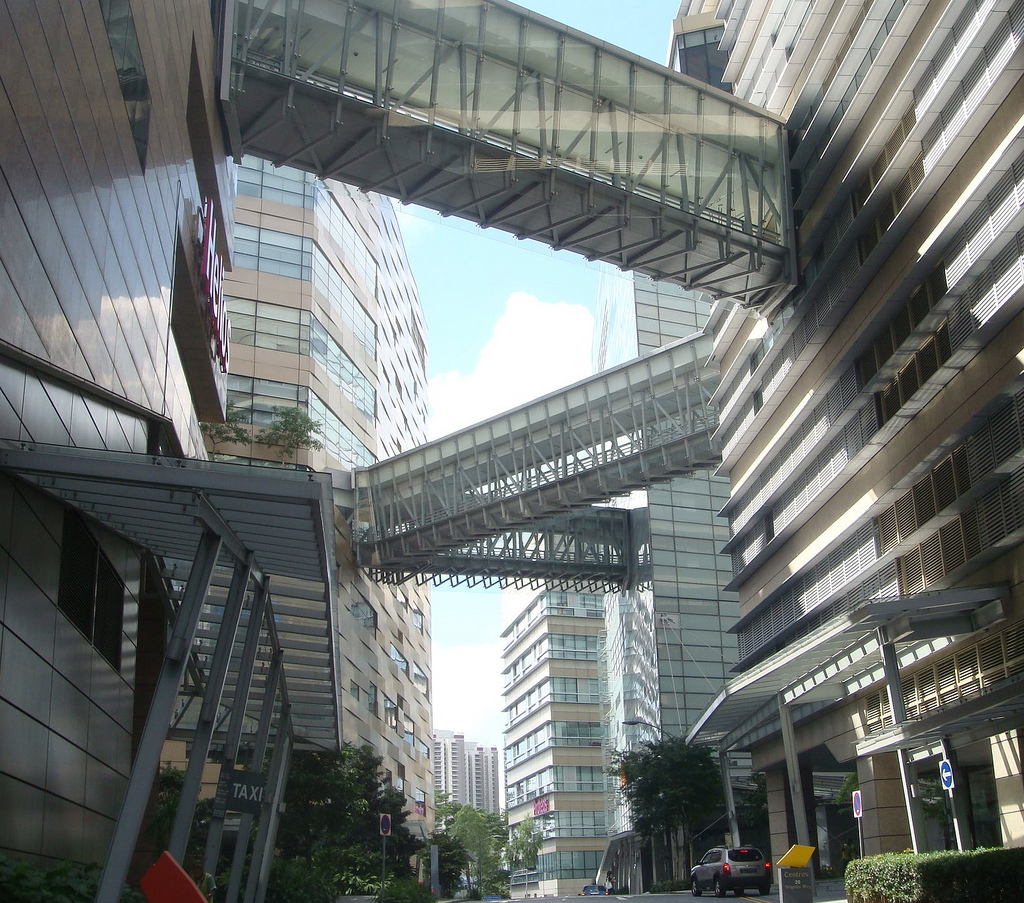
- Established: 2003; 23 years ago
- Location: Queenstown, Singapore
- Interactive map of Biopolis 启奥城 பயோபோலிஸ்
- Website: Official website (2007 archive)

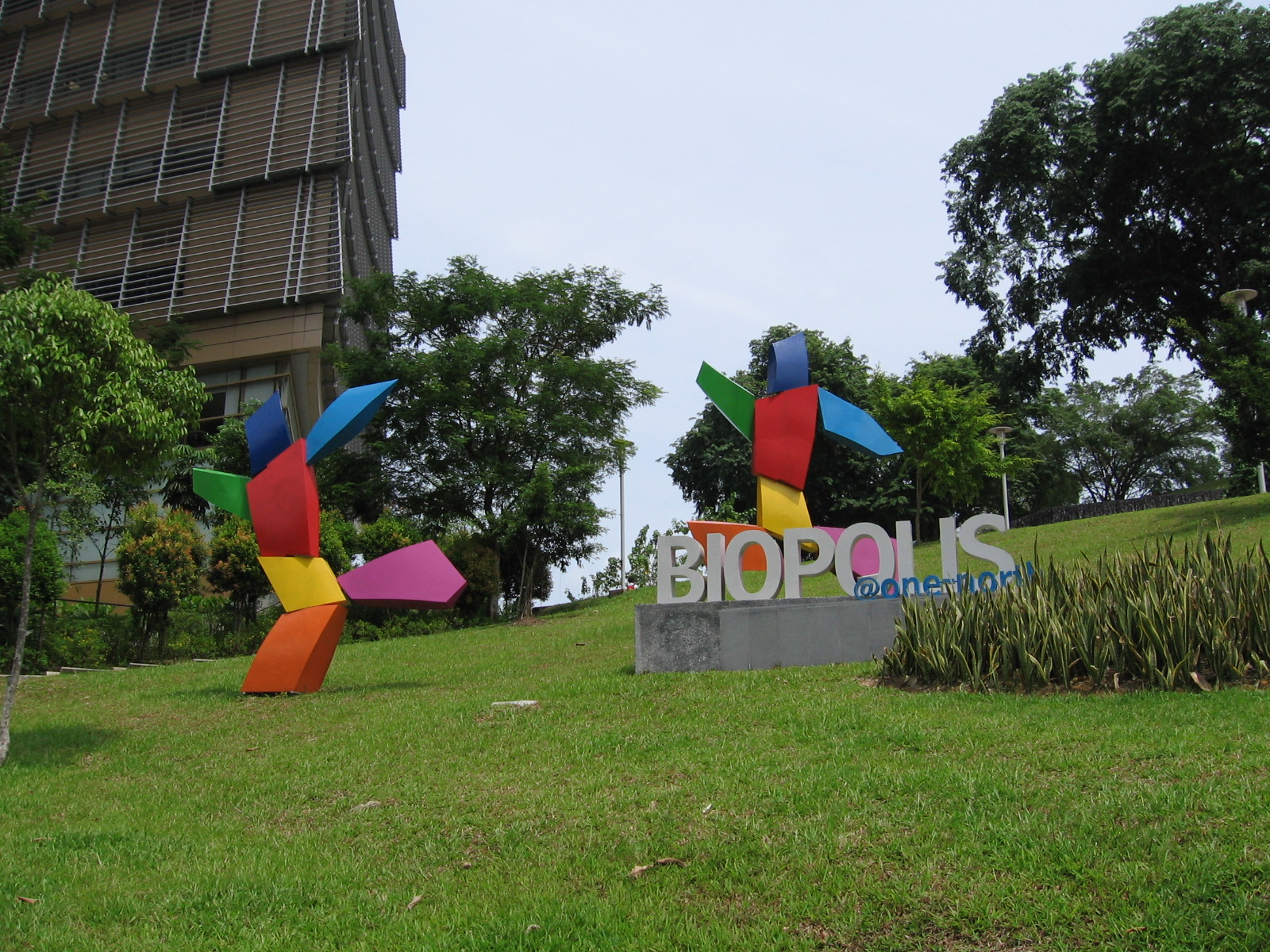
Biopolis at Buona Vista

Biopolis (Note: Chinese: 启奥城; Malay: Biopolis; Tamil: பயோபோலிஸ்) is a research and development centre for biomedical sciences in Singapore. It is located at one-north in Buona Vista, and is close to the National University of Singapore, the Singapore Polytechnic, the Singapore Institute of Technology, the National University Hospital, the Singapore Science Park, Ministry of Education, ESSEC Business School, INSEAD Business School, and Fusionopolis. This campus is dedicated to providing space for biomedical research and development activities and promoting peer review and collaboration among the private and public scientific community.

== Development ==
=== Phase 1 ===
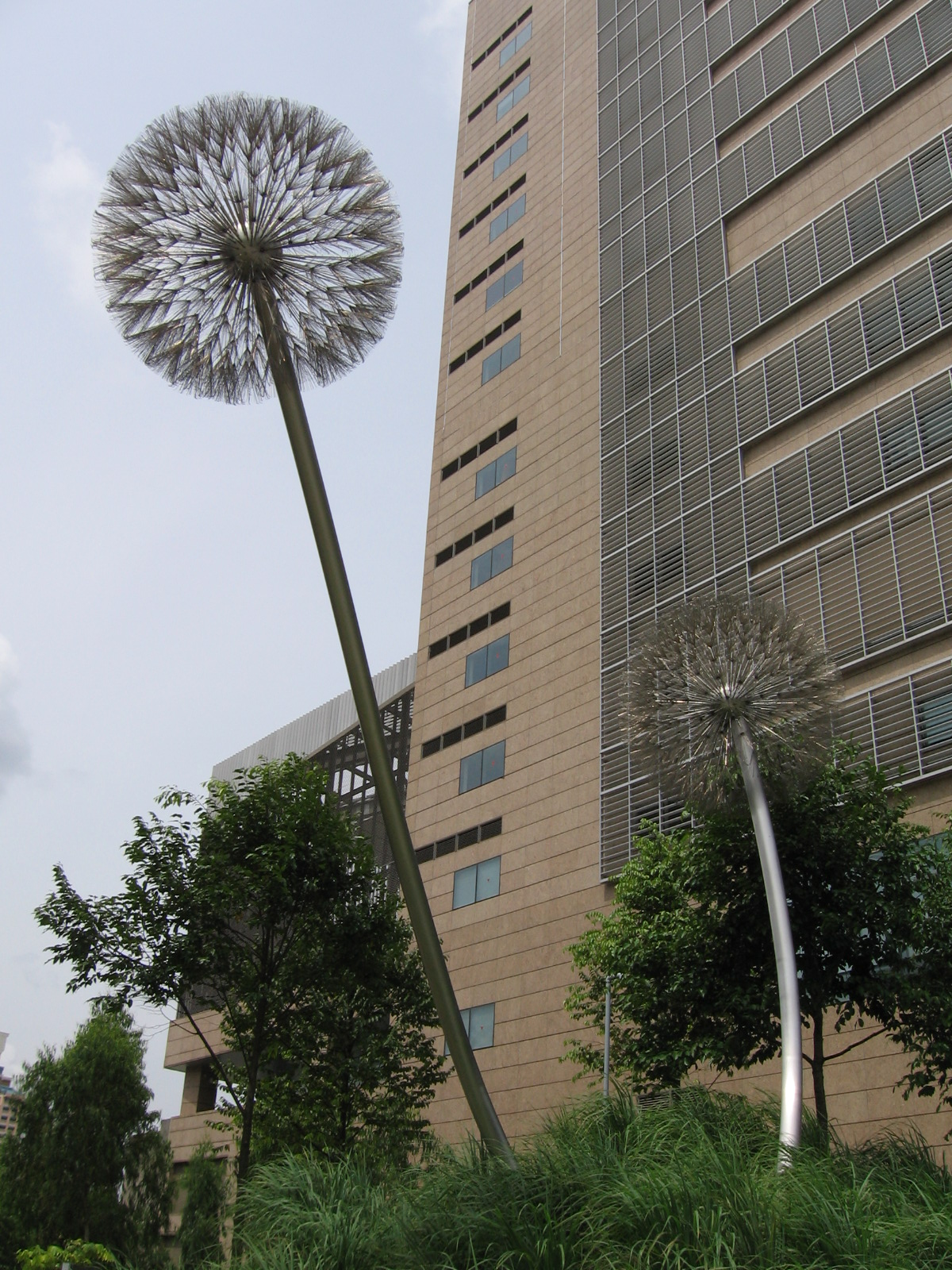
Dandelion sculpture in Biopolis

Biopolis Phase 1, designed by world-renowned architect Zaha Hadid, is a 185,000 m^{2} (2,000,000 ft²) biomedical complex of seven buildings that were constructed from June 2003 to March 2004 at a cost of S$500 million. They are namely: Nanos, Genome, Helios, Chromos, Proteos, Matrix and Centros. Several government agencies, publicly funded research institutes and research labs of pharmaceutical and biotechnological companies are located there.

=== Phase 2 ===
Biopolis Phase 2 was completed in October 2006 with a seven-storey 37,000 m^{2} complex comprising two blocks, Neuros and Immunos. The two blocks will house private research institutes focused on neuroscience and immunology respectively. The complex cost S$70 million and constructed over 18 months. The new addition increases the Biopolis research complex to a total of 222,000 m^{2}, or about half the size of Suntec City.

=== Phase 3 ===
Biopolis Phase 3, comprising two blocks, Synapse and Amnios, was awarded to Crescendas Group by JTC Corporation under a design-build-own-operate basis with a 30+30 year lease. It started construction in the 3rd quarter of 2009 and was completed in the 2nd quarter of 2011. It measures 41,505 square meters in total, containing space for laboratories, research facilities, offices and retail operations.

=== Phase 4 ===
Biopolis Phase 4, the Procter & Gamble Singapore Innovation Centre, was announced by JTC Corporation on 25 January 2010, and opened on 28 March 2014. It is the largest investment in a private research facility in Singapore at S$250 million.

=== Phase 5 ===
Biopolis Phase 5, consisting of Nucleos, was completed in 2014. It is used for pre-clinical trials.

=== Phase 6 ===
On 27 November 2019, Senior Minister of State for Trade and Industry Koh Poh Koon announced that Biopolis Phase 6 will be built by mid-2022 to meet demand from biotechnology start-ups. The expansion of Biopolis is part of initiatives to better support such start-ups. Biopolis Phase 6 will add a further 35,000 sq m for research activities (including 2,000 sq m of laboratory spaces), with 6,000 sq m more for office and retail space. On 16 March 2020, JTC Corporation awarded the site to Ho Bee, which will design the 12-storey building, named Elementum, with elements of nature, technology and wellness incorporated.

== Features ==
=== Amenities ===
For the general public, Biopolis has eight shops, four restaurants, four cafes, a 300-seater food court, a fast food restaurant, a pub and a childcare centre.

=== Function rooms ===
For its members, Biopolis has a 480-seater auditorium and four 250-seater lecture theaters. It also has 13 meeting rooms.

== Accommodation ==
The Rochester is a major development in Vista Xchange at one-north. The mixed-use development comprises private residences, serviced apartments, hotel rooms, recreational and retail facilities.

one-north Residences is another completed residential project in one-north.

== Biopolis arts programme ==
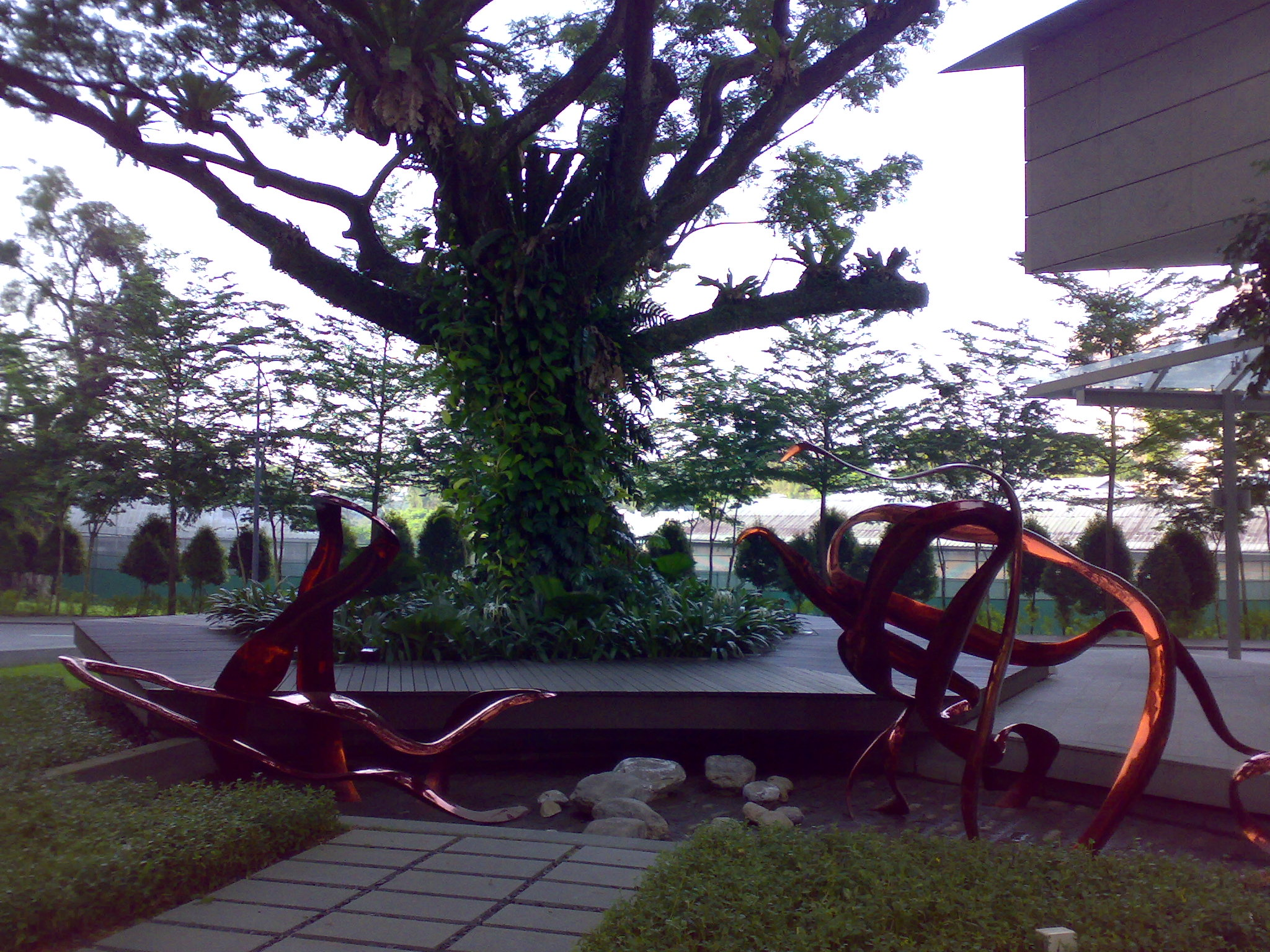
A piece of sculpture at Biopolis

An initiative of the one-north arts program, one-north Development Group (oDG) of JTC Corporation launched the first Biopolis Arts Program@one-north on 14 May 2002. oDG supports the nurturing of the local and overseas arts community, by way of co-developing and funding the art programs in one-north. All major developmental projects in one-north will be encouraged to contribute towards the funding of significant artwork in-situ.
