= Guan Kee Fried Kway Teow =

Street food stall in Singapore

- Interactive map of Guan Kee Fried Kway Teow

Restaurant information
- Food type: Street food
- Location: 20 Ghim Moh Road, #01-19, Ghim Moh Road Market & Food Centre, Ghim Moh, 270020, Singapore
- Coordinates: 1.3108852°N 103.7878043°E

Guan Kee Fried Kway Teow is a street food stall in the Ghim Moh Road Market & Food Centre in Ghim Moh, Singapore. The food stall was awarded the Michelin Bib Gourmand in 2019.

== History ==
The stall was founded in May 1969. The original stall was located on the same area which the Thye Hong Centre currently occupies. However, the stall was forced to move to Ghim Moh Road Market & Food Centre in 1978 due to newly introduced government regulations to improve the environment in Singapore. The stall is run by an elderly couple.

== Reception ==
The stall was awarded the Michelin Bib Gourmand Award in 2019. It has maintained its position in the Michelin Bib Gourmand. Lhu Wen Kai of TheSmartLocal gave the stall an honourable mention in his list of the fifteen best Char Kway Teow stalls in Singapore, as ongoing renovations prevented him from visiting the stall. Jocelyn Tan of Lifestyle Asia included the stall in her guide to the eight best stalls in the food centre.
