= Buona Vista =

Housing estate in Queenstown, Singapore

Coordinates: 1.3072°N 103.7906°E

Buona Vista is a housing estate located in the subzones of one-north and Holland Drive in the residential township of Queenstown in Singapore. The housing estate is served by the Buona Vista MRT station which links it up with the MRT system. It also has a bus terminal.

== History ==
The Buona Vista estate was developed by the Housing and Development Board in the early 1970s as the neighbourhood 6 of Queenstown. The first flats (at Holland Close and Holland Avenue) were balloted on 10 July 1973 under the Home Ownership for the People Scheme.

== Geography ==
The Buona Vista estate is centred around Holland Close, Holland Avenue and Holland Drive. It is close to the Dover and Ghim Moh estates, and Holland Village. It shares its name with North Buona Vista Road and South Buona Vista Road, which together is a hilly winding road that navigates through Kent Ridge.

== Political history ==
Buona Vista is currently under the jurisdiction of Tanjong Pagar Group Representation Constituency as of 2025 under the namesake Buona Vista and Telok Blangah divisions. The Buona Vista division, which formerly belonged to Holland-Bukit Timah GRC until 2011, which includes Holland Drive and Holland Village, is helmed by the current Minister of Defence Chan Chun Sing. The Telok Blangah division, which previously being a part of West Coast Group Representation Constituency, was helmed by Rachel Ong.

== Sources ==
- Victor R Savage, Brenda S A Yeoh (2003), Toponymics - A Study of Singapore Street Names, Eastern Universities Press, ISBN 981-210-205-1
