= Buona Vista MRT station =

Mass Rapid Transit station in Singapore

Buona Vista EW21 CC22 波那维斯达 புவன விஸ்தா
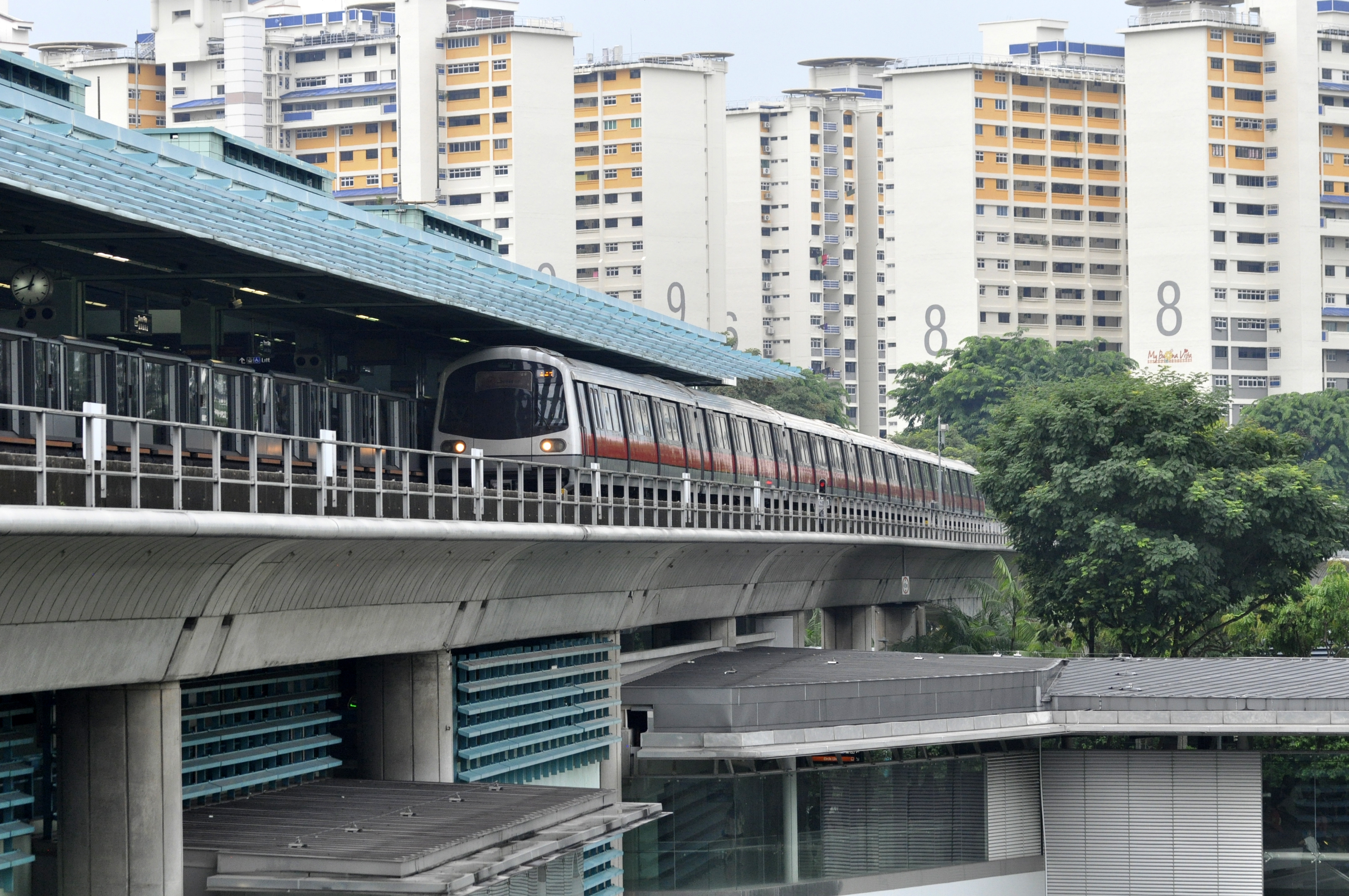
- Exterior view of the East–West Line platforms at Buona Vista MRT station.

General information
- Location: 100 North Buona Vista Road, Singapore 139345 (EWL); 150 North Buona Vista Road, Singapore 139350 (CCL)
- Coordinates: 01°18′26.4″N 103°47′24.1″E
- System: Mass Rapid Transit (MRT) interchange
- Owner: Land Transport Authority
- Operator: SMRT Trains
- Line: East–West Line Circle Line
- Platforms: 4 (2 island platforms)
- Tracks: 4
- Connections: Bus, Taxi

Construction
- Structure type: Elevated (East–West Line); Underground (Circle Line)
- Platform levels: 2
- Parking: Yes (The Star Vista, Rochester Mall, The Metropolis)
- Cycle facilities: Yes
- Accessible: Yes

Other information
- Station code: BNV

History
- Opened: 12 March 1988; 38 years ago (East–West Line); 8 October 2011; 15 years ago (Circle Line)
- Former names: North Buona Vista

Passengers
- June 2024: 22,877 per day

Services
Preceding station	Mass Rapid Transit	Following station
Commonwealth towards Pasir Ris	East–West Line	Dover towards Tuas Link
Holland Village Clockwise	Circle Line	one-north Anticlockwise
Holland Village towards Dhoby Ghaut	Circle Line	one-north towards Prince Edward Road
Track layout
Location
- Location within Singapore Rail central area

Buona Vista MRT station is a Mass Rapid Transit (MRT) interchange station on the East–West Line and Circle Line in Queenstown, Singapore. This station is close to one-north, a high-technology business park for the biomedical science, infocomm technology and media industries. It is located near the junction of North Buona Vista Road, Commonwealth Avenue and Commonwealth Avenue West.

== History ==
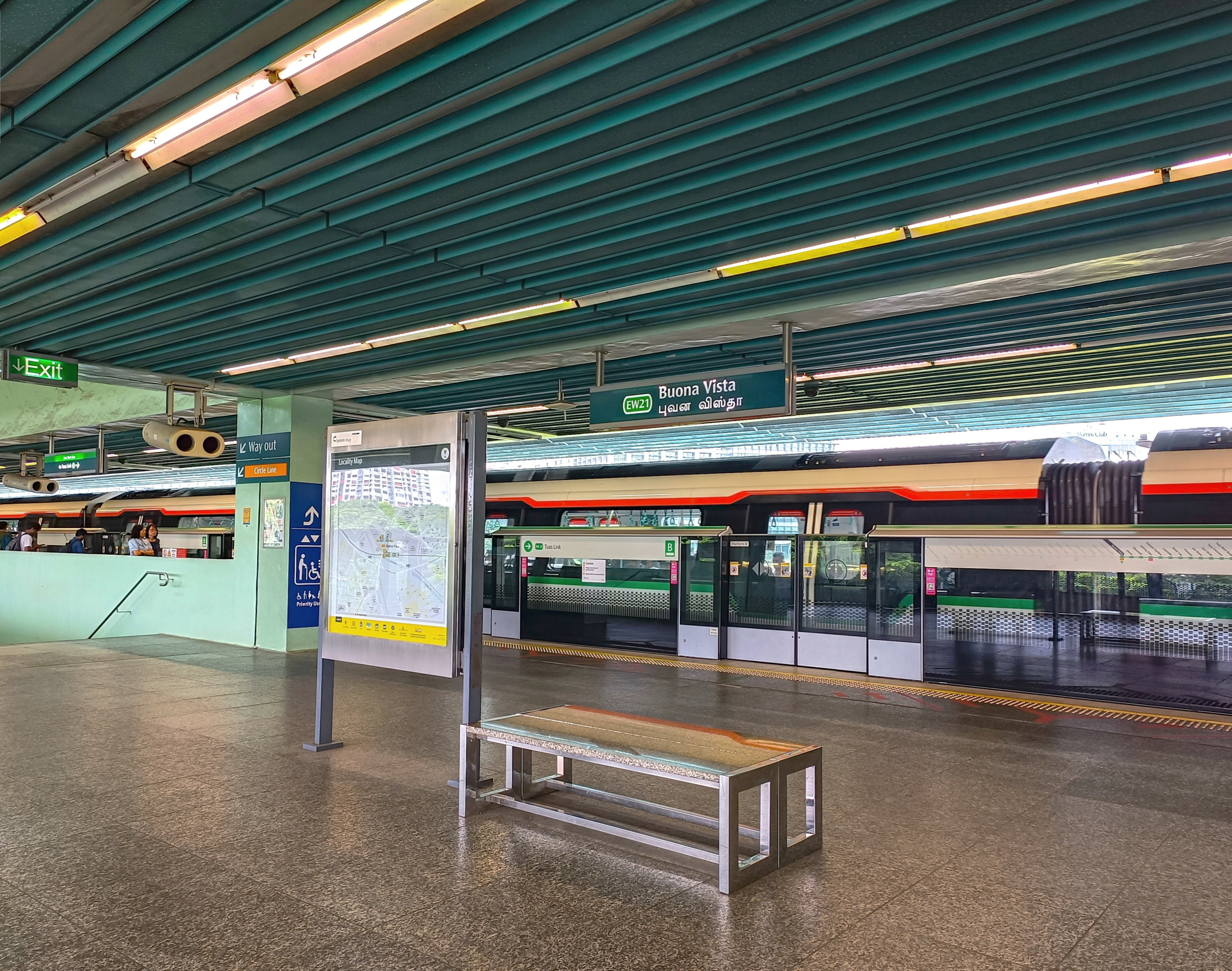
East–West Line platforms at the station.

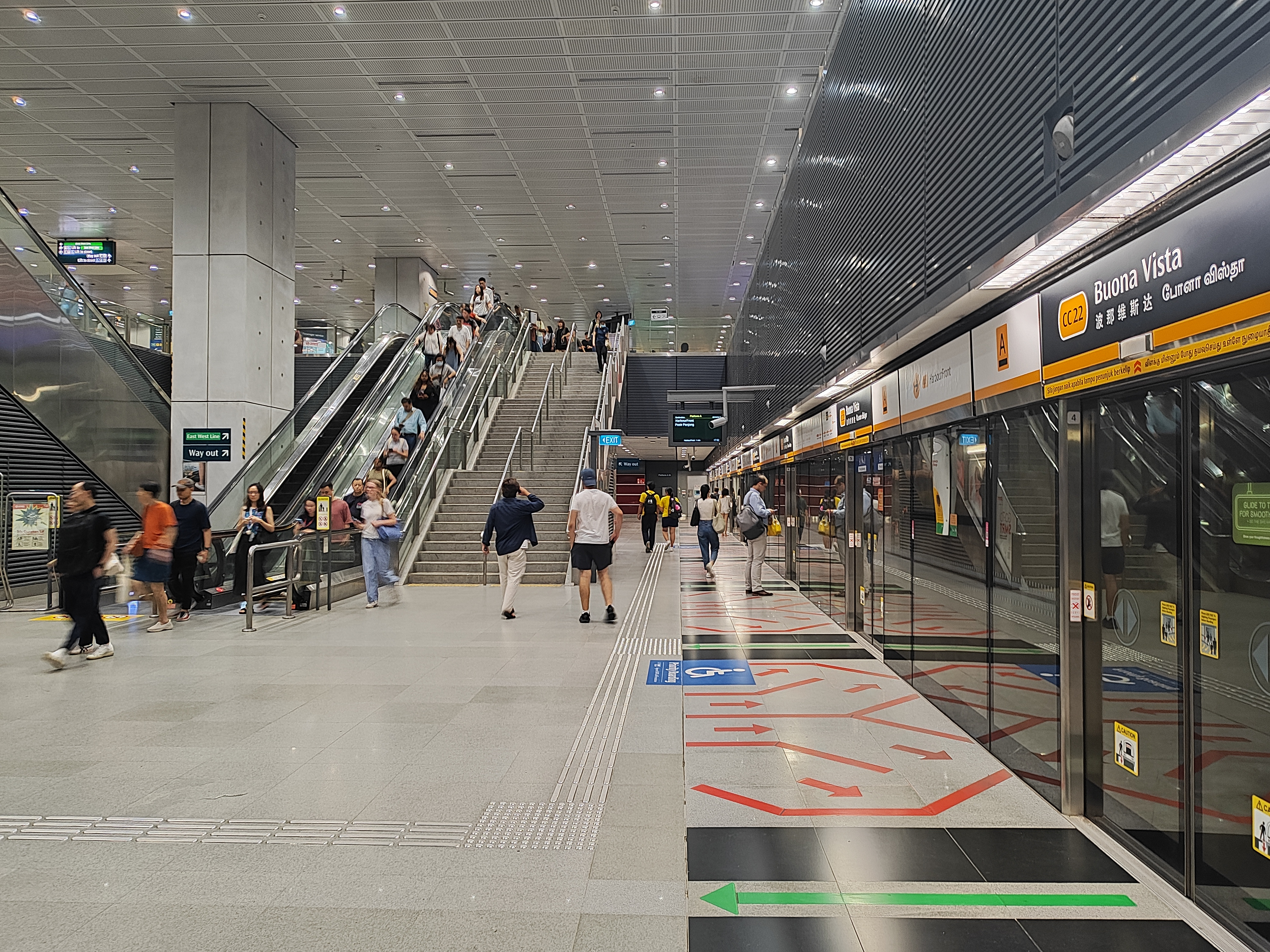
Circle Line platform A

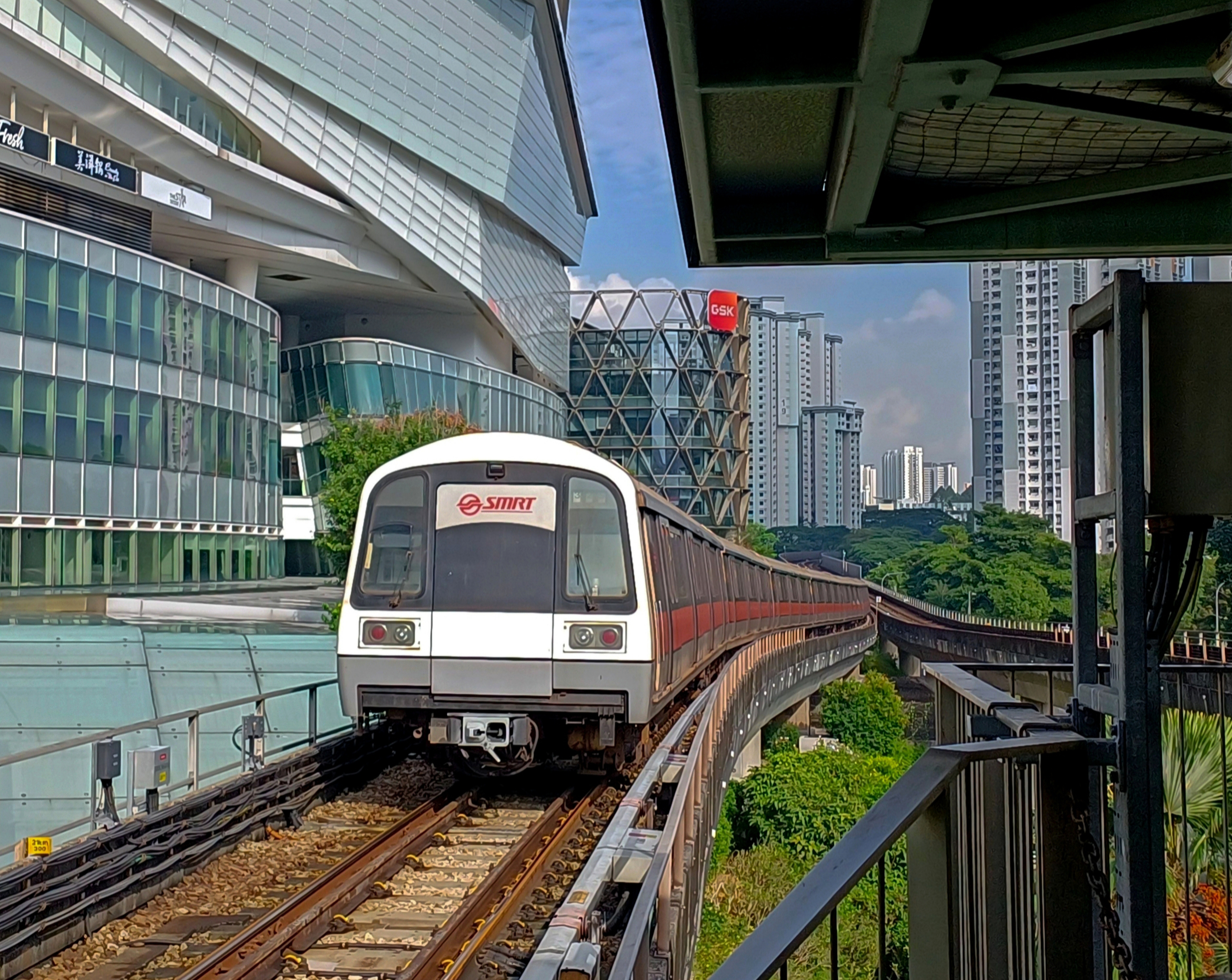
A Kawasaki C151 approaching the EWL platforms.

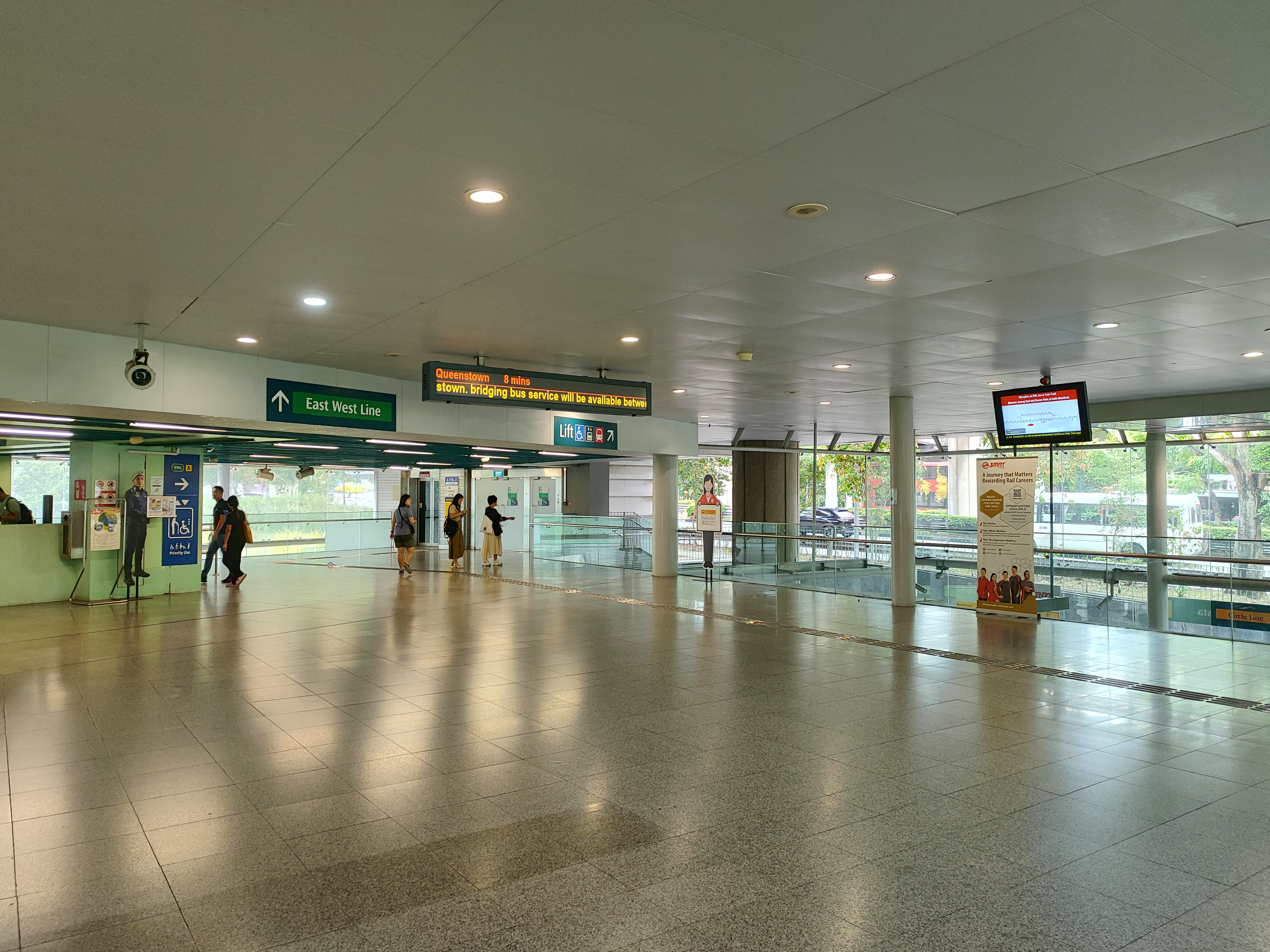
The concourse between the EWL and CCL platforms.

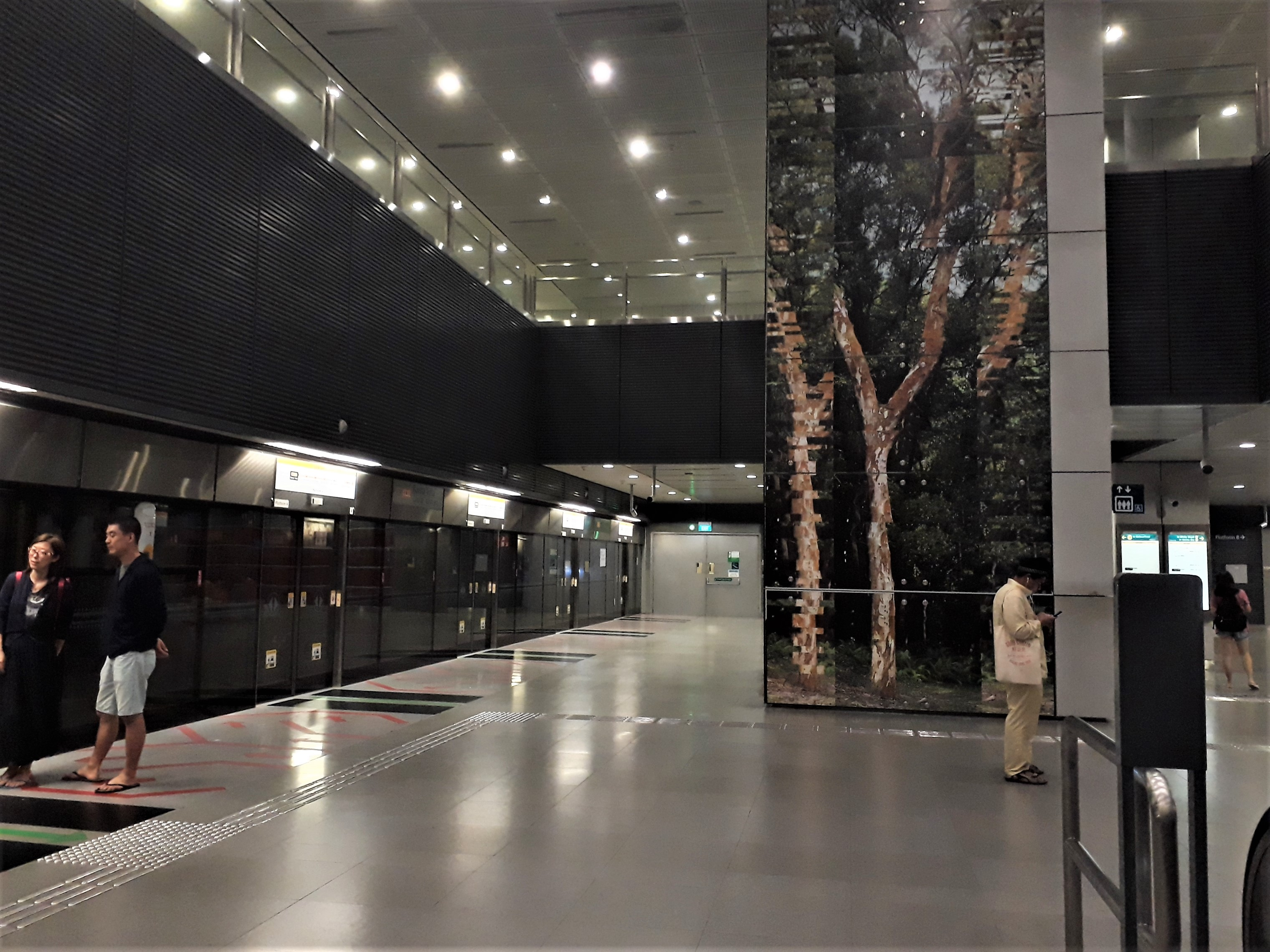
Art-in-Transit at the CCL platforms.

Buona Vista station opened on 12 March 1988, as part of Phase 1B of the MRT line which runs from Outram Park to Clementi. The station was initially planned to be linked to a Light Rail Transit line that would have served residents living near the area, as well as students from the National University of Singapore and Singapore Polytechnic, as announced by Singapore's then-Communications Minister Mah Bow Tan. However, it was eventually not built due to its lack of economic viability.

Following the 25 March 2005 accident, the Land Transport Authority (LTA) made the decision in 2008 to install platform screen doors in this station, whereby operations commenced on 10 June 2011.

=== Circle Line interchange ===
With the construction of the Circle line from 11 January 2005, the bridge was demolished and replaced with a newer one. The second level of the East–West Line station was also converted into a transfer level between the two lines. The Circle line platforms were opened on 8 October 2011, while the two new exits share the same location as the original one.

== Station details ==
The station is located near the junction of North Buona Vista Road and Commonwealth Avenue West, near The Star.

=== East–West Line ===
The station is situated between Commonwealth and Dover stations. Its official station code is “EW21”.

The station consists of an island platform, with doors opening on the right.

=== Circle Line ===
The station is situated between Holland Village and one-north stations. Its other official station code is “CC22”.

The station consists of one island platform, with doors opening on the right. The seats are dots in matrices, spelling the station's name.

=== Artworks ===
The artwork featured under the Art in Transit programme is The Tree of Life by Gilles Massot. Located on the lift shaft in the CCL station, the artwork depicts a eucalyptus tree located at the nearby Kent Ridge Park that has been digitally edited to create an effect similar to David Hockney's photo montages. The tree also represents the jungle greenery which used to exist next to the above-ground station and is a result of the deep impression left on the artist of the landscape and view of the area.

There is also a mural as part of the heritage-themed Comic Connect public art display by SMRT. Created by David Liew, the mural depicts Buona Vista's history from the 1930's to the 1970's including the Singapore Motor Club, its various former military bases, and the Ghim Moh Estate.
