= One-north MRT station =

Mass Rapid Transit station in Singapore

one-north CC23 纬壹 ஒன்-நார்த்
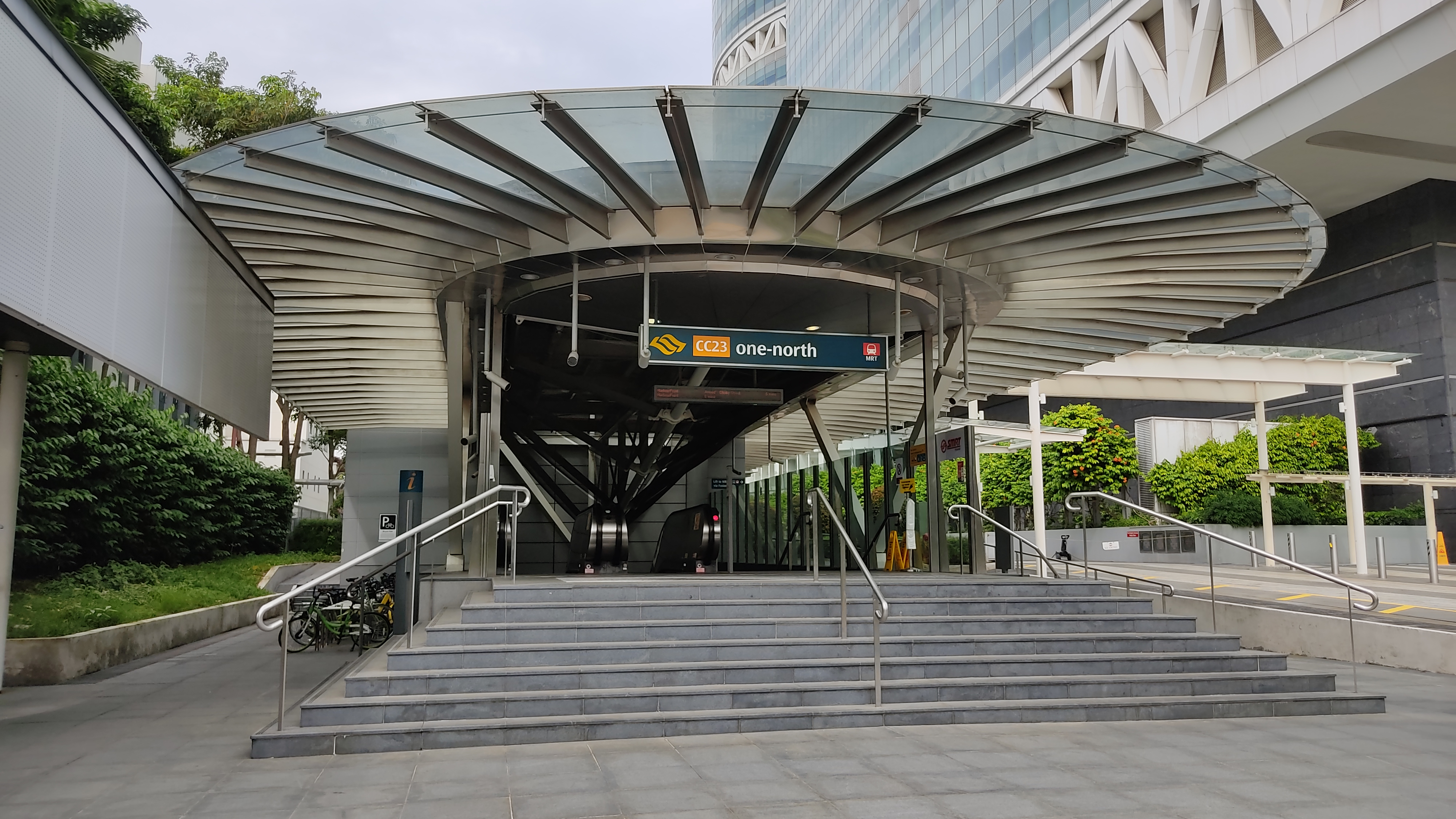
- Exit A of the station

General information
- Location: 9 Ayer Rajah Avenue, Singapore 138647
- Coordinates: 01°17′58″N 103°47′13″E
- System: Mass Rapid Transit (MRT) station
- Owner: Land Transport Authority
- Operator: SMRT Trains
- Line: Circle Line
- Platforms: 2 (1 island platform)
- Tracks: 2
- Connections: Bus, Taxi

Construction
- Structure type: Underground
- Platform levels: 1
- Accessible: Yes

Other information
- Station code: ONH

History
- Opened: 8 October 2011; 15 years ago
- Former names: Portsdown

Passengers
- June 2024: 12,332 per day

Services
Preceding station	Mass Rapid Transit	Following station
Buona Vista Clockwise	Circle Line	Kent Ridge Anticlockwise
Buona Vista towards Dhoby Ghaut	Circle Line	Kent Ridge towards Prince Edward Road
Track layout
Location
- Location within Singapore Rail central area

one-north MRT station is an underground Mass Rapid Transit (MRT) station on the Circle Line (CCL) in Queenstown, Singapore. Located along Ayer Rajah Avenue underneath Fusionpolis One, the station serves the business park of one-north. Other surrounding developments include one-north Park and Dover Medical Centre.

The station was announced as part of CCL Stages 4 and 5 and revenue service began on 8 October 2011. one-north station features A Visual Narrative of Pandemonic Rhythmic Movement by Yek Wong as part of the MRT network's Art-in-Transit programme.

== History ==
In 2003, the Land Transport Authority (LTA) announced that one-north station would be part of the Circle Line (CCL) and constructed as part of Stages 4 and 5 of the CCL. The station was originally planned to be situated along North Buona Vista Road, but the one-north development group convinced the one-north steering committee (Note: The steering committee consisted of important officials from the government involved in the development of one-north, which included the Urban Redevelopment Authority (URA) and the LTA.) to realign the station underneath Fusionopolis One – a planned transit-oriented development – to provide direct access to key areas within one-north. Although the steering committee was concerned that the realignment might reduce the development potential of the surrounding land, the development group suggested increasing land density to mitigate the issue.

The contract for the construction of one-north station was awarded to Woh Hup (Pte) Ltd–Shanghai Tunnel Engineering Co. Ltd–Alpine Mayreder bau GmbH (WH-STEC-AM) Joint Venture in 2004. The S$399.91 million (US$236.6 million) contract included the construction of Holland, Buona Vista and NUH stations. The construction of the 8.25-kilometre (5.13-mile) bored tunnels required the use of 6.35-metre (20.8 ft) diameter Earth pressure balance machines. As announced by transport minister Lui Tuck Yew during his visit to the CCL4 and 5 stations on 1 August 2011, the station began revenue service on 8 October of that year.

== Details ==
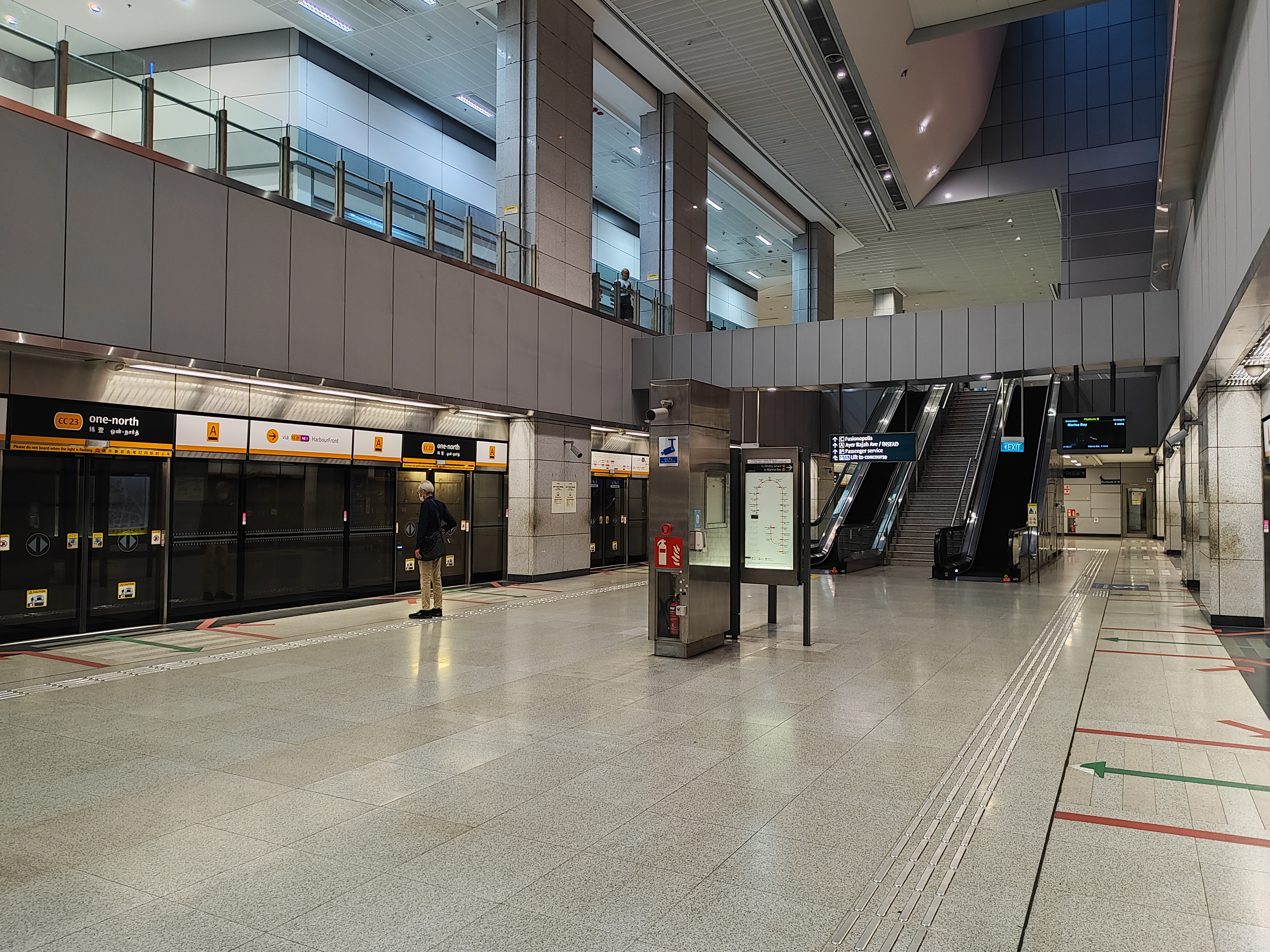
Platform level of the station

one-north station serves the CCL and is between the Buona Vista and Kent Ridge stations. The official station code is CC23. Being part of the CCL, the station is operated by SMRT Trains. Trains runs every 5 to 7 minutes in both directions daily.

The station is located within one-north along Ayer Rajah Avenue and is directly underneath Fusionpolis One. Other surrounding developments include Dover Medical Centre, Aldersgate Methodist Church, one-north Park, Fairfield Methodist School, INSEAD Asia Campus and Unilever Four Acres Singapore Campus.

The station is wheelchair accessible. A tactile system, consisting of tiles with rounded or elongated raised studs, guides visually impaired commuters through the station, with dedicated tactile routes that connect the station entrances to the platforms. Wider fare gates allow easier access for wheelchair users into the station. one-north is the only station on the MRT network that doesn't have capital letters in its name and is also the only one with a hyphen.

=== Art-in-Transit ===
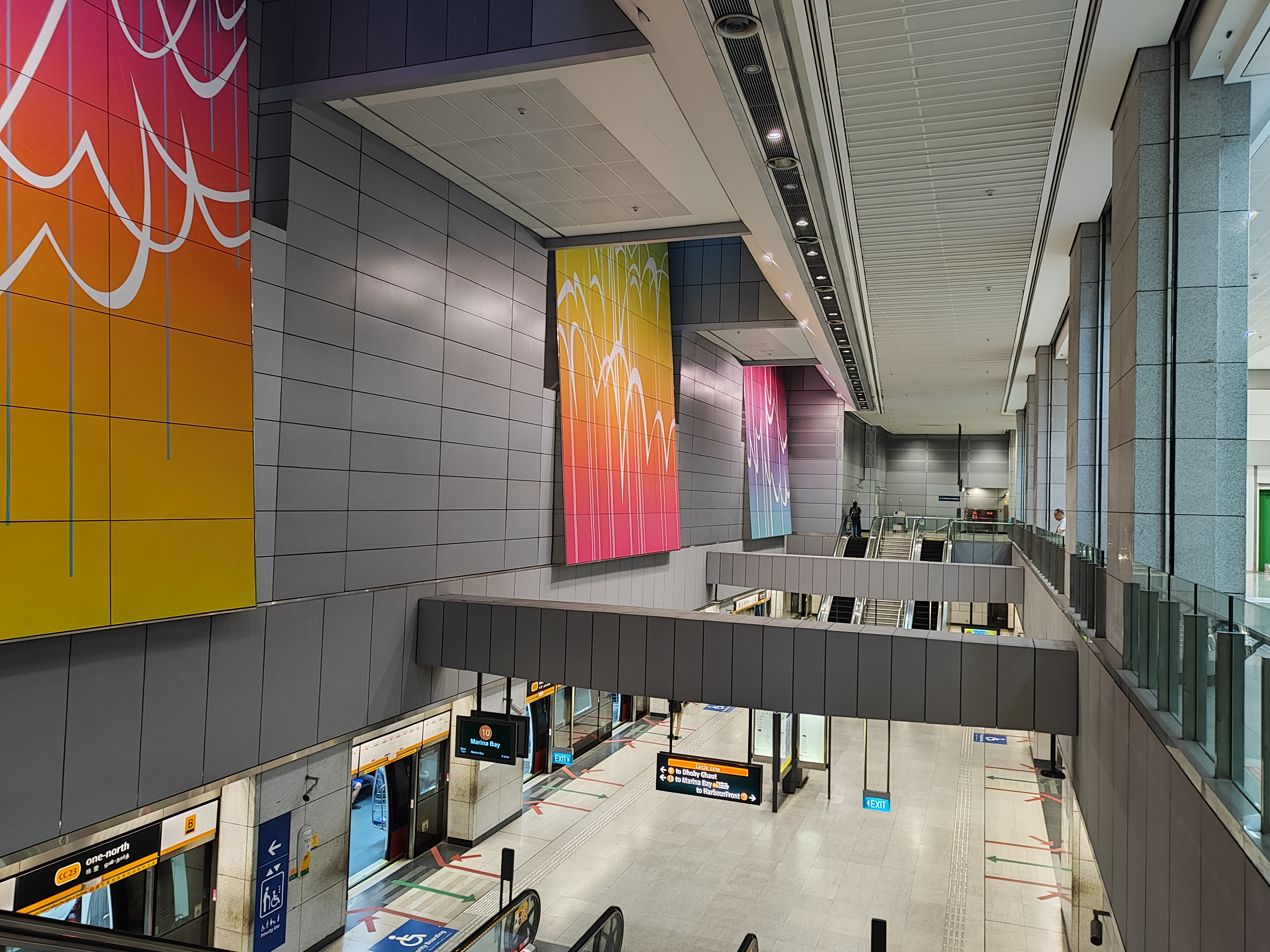
Art-in-Transit above the platforms

A Visual Narrative of Pandemonic Rhythmic Movement by Yek Wong is displayed at this station as part of the MRT network's Art-in-Transit (AiT) Programme, a public art showcase which integrates artworks into the MRT network. The three artwork panels represents life in the train station, showing people's movements throughout the day, while the bright colours of the artwork illustrates the progression of time. The white lines over the artwork reflect the dynamic energy of the station. As a triptych, the work aim to evoke a poetic rhythm and are illuminated by natural light streaming through the skylights, giving a cathedral-like atmosphere to the station.

Inspired by the movement of commuters in the station, Wong sought to employ his style of lines and bright colours, which he developed over 15 years while studying and practising art in Las Vegas. Unlike his other paintings, Wong only printed out the work from his computer on aluminum panels to ensure its durability on display. Wong believed the digital process reflects the locality's drive for research and technology. The work was initially planned to be printed on vitreous enamel panels, but the colours produced did not match the original, and instead it was printed on aluminum. To protect the work against discoloration under UV exposure, the skylights over each panel have been treated with thermal coating.

== Notes and references ==
=== Bibliography ===
- Cheong, Colin (2012). The Circle Line: Linking All Lines (PDF). Singapore: Land Transport Authority. ISBN 978-981-4342-02-5.
- Phua, Shi Hui (2018). One-north: fostering research, innovation, and entrepreneurship (PDF). Singapore: Centre for Liveable Cities. ISBN 978-981-11-9288-3.
- Zhuang, Justin (2013). Art in transit: Circle Line MRT. Singapore: Land Transport Authority. ISBN 978-981-07-4982-8. OCLC 854958677.
