= Queenstown MRT station =

Mass Rapid Transit station in Singapore

Queenstown EW19 女皇镇 குவீன்ஸ்டவுன்
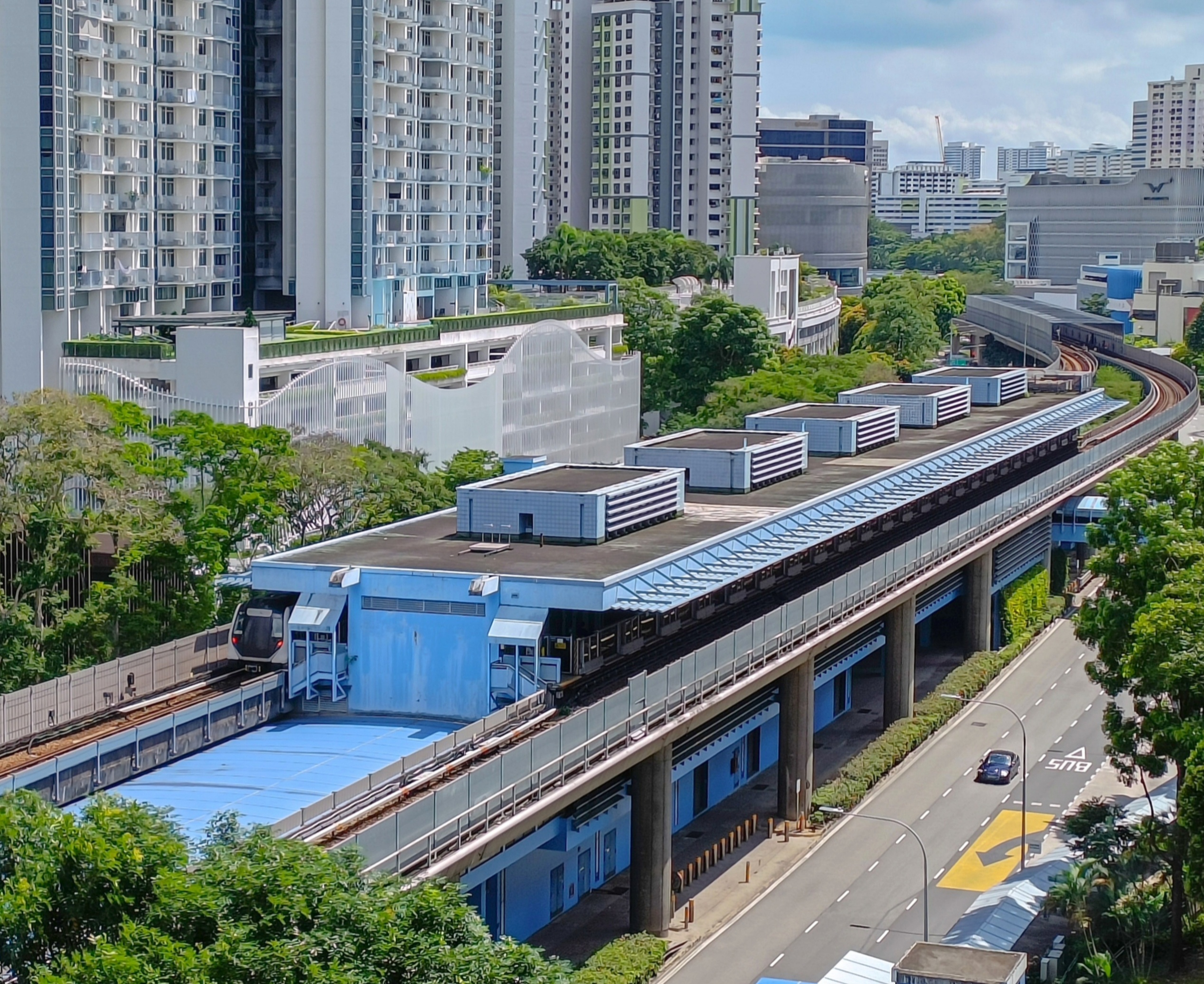
- Exterior of the Station

General information
- Location: 301 Commonwealth Avenue; Singapore 149729
- Coordinates: 1°17′39.99″N 103°48′22.01″E
- System: Mass Rapid Transit (MRT) station
- Owner: Land Transport Authority (LTA)
- Operator: SMRT Trains Ltd (SMRT Corporation)
- Line: East–West Line
- Platforms: 2 (1 island platform)
- Tracks: 2
- Connections: Bus, taxi

Construction
- Structure type: Elevated
- Platform levels: 1
- Cycle facilities: Yes
- Accessible: Yes

History
- Opened: 12 March 1988; 38 years ago
- Former names: Princess, Commonwealth

Passengers
- June 2024: 15,262 per day

Services
Preceding station	Mass Rapid Transit	Following station
Redhill towards Pasir Ris	East–West Line	Commonwealth towards Tuas Link
Track layout
Location
- Location within Singapore Rail central area

Queenstown MRT station is an elevated Mass Rapid Transit (MRT) station on the East–West Line (EWL) in Queenstown, Singapore. Located on Commonwealth Avenue, it serves surrounding landmarks such as Queenstown Primary School and the Princess House along with a few nearby churches.

First announced in May 1982 as Princess, it was later announced as Commonwealth and would be constructed as part of Phase IA of the MRT system. Ten blocks in Commonwealth Avenue and Stirling Road were torn down for the station's construction, alongside the realignment of Commonwealth Avenue. A labour dispute occurred between the station's contractor, Sumitomo Construction, and its construction workers, which led to a temporary halt in the station's construction in September 1985.

In March 1987, Commonwealth and Queenstown switched names in March 1987 to better reflect the locality. Queenstown commenced operations along with the entire MRT system on 12 March 1988. Half-height platform screen doors and high-volume low-speed fans were installed by August 2011 and the first quarter of 2013, respectively, with a new exit and pedestrian bridge constructed in August 2015.

== History ==
Queenstown station was first included in the early plans of the MRT system as Princess station in May 1982. The station was announced as Commonwealth station as part of Phase IA of the MRT system, an 8.5-kilometre (5.3-mile) segment which spans from Tiong Bahru to Clementi. This segment was initially planned to be built as part of Phase II, but the completion date was pushed earlier to 1988 to increase Phase I's catchment area.

By October 1983, eleven local companies, which included nine joint ventures with foreign businesses, were shortlisted for the design work of Phase IA out of 38 applications. In January 1984, it was announced that a five-member team consisting of Mott, Hay and Anderson, Sir William Halcrow and Partners, BSK-BS Konsult, DP Architects, and the Public Works Department (PWD), won a S$5.99 million (US$4.47 million) contract to be architectural and engineering consultants of Phase IA. In June, it was announced that ten blocks in Commonwealth Avenue and Stirling Road would be torn down for the station's construction, affecting 800 residents. Commonwealth Avenue would also be realigned so that the station would not straddle the road.

External Media
- Map of Queenstown's location By The Straits Times
- Flats to be demolished for Queenstown By The Business Times
- Impression of Queenstown By The Straits Times

Nine single tenderers and joint ventures were prequalified for Contract 202 by October 1984, which covered the construction of Redhill and Commonwealth stations as well as viaducts from Delta Swimming Complex to Queensway Circus. The PWD also called for tenderers in the same month for the realignment of Commonwealth Avenue. The Mass Rapid Transit Corporation (MRTC) awarded the contract to Sumitomo Construction in February 1985 for S$50 million (US$37.31 million). It was also expected that construction of Redhill and Commonwealth would start in the same month and be finished by December 1987.

However, in 25 September, The Straits Times reported a labour dispute between 130 Thai workers and Sumitomo over living conditions and income tax deduction from their salaries, resulting in the station's construction to be halted; this was partially resolved the next day, with 40 of the Thai workers returning to the construction site. By October, a westbound section of Commonwealth was diverted for the station, and two bus stops were replaced by a new one. In March 1987, the MRTC announced that Queenstown and Commonwealth stations would swap names as Queenstown station is closer to areas with the name "Commonwealth" and vice versa. In February 1988, it was announced that Queenstown, along with Commonwealth station, would have an open house on 20 and 21 February, with expected operations moved to the middle of March. On 12 March 1988, Prime Minister Lee Kuan Yew officially launched the entire system, including stations in the Tiong Bahru-Clementi stretch. During the opening ceremony, Lee addressed to a crowd of 500 guests before riding a train to Queenstown.

Following a rise in track intrusions as well as commuters slipping when rushing for the train, the LTA and SMRT decided to install platform screen doors. After several successful tests, half-height platform screen doors were eventually installed and commenced operations at Queenstown station by August 2011. The station was installed with high-volume low-speed fans by the first quarter of 2013. It was announced in October 2011 that Queenstown, along with Commonwealth and Clementi, would receive new pedestrian bridges to the stations from both sides of the roads and entrances with fare gates and ticketing machines. Work started on the upgrades by June 2012 with expected completion by mid-2015. The works were completed in August 2015 for Queenstown and Commonwealth.

== Details ==
Queenstown station is on the EWL with the station number of EW19, situated between Commonwealth and Redhill stations. When it opened, it had the station number of W5 before being changed to its current station code in August 2001 as a part of a system-wide campaign to cater to the expanding MRT System. As a part of the EWL, the station is operated by SMRT Trains. Like many stations on the initial MRT network, Queenstown has an island platform and is elevated. The station operates between 5:47 am to 12:10 am daily, with train frequencies varying from 2 to 5 minutes.

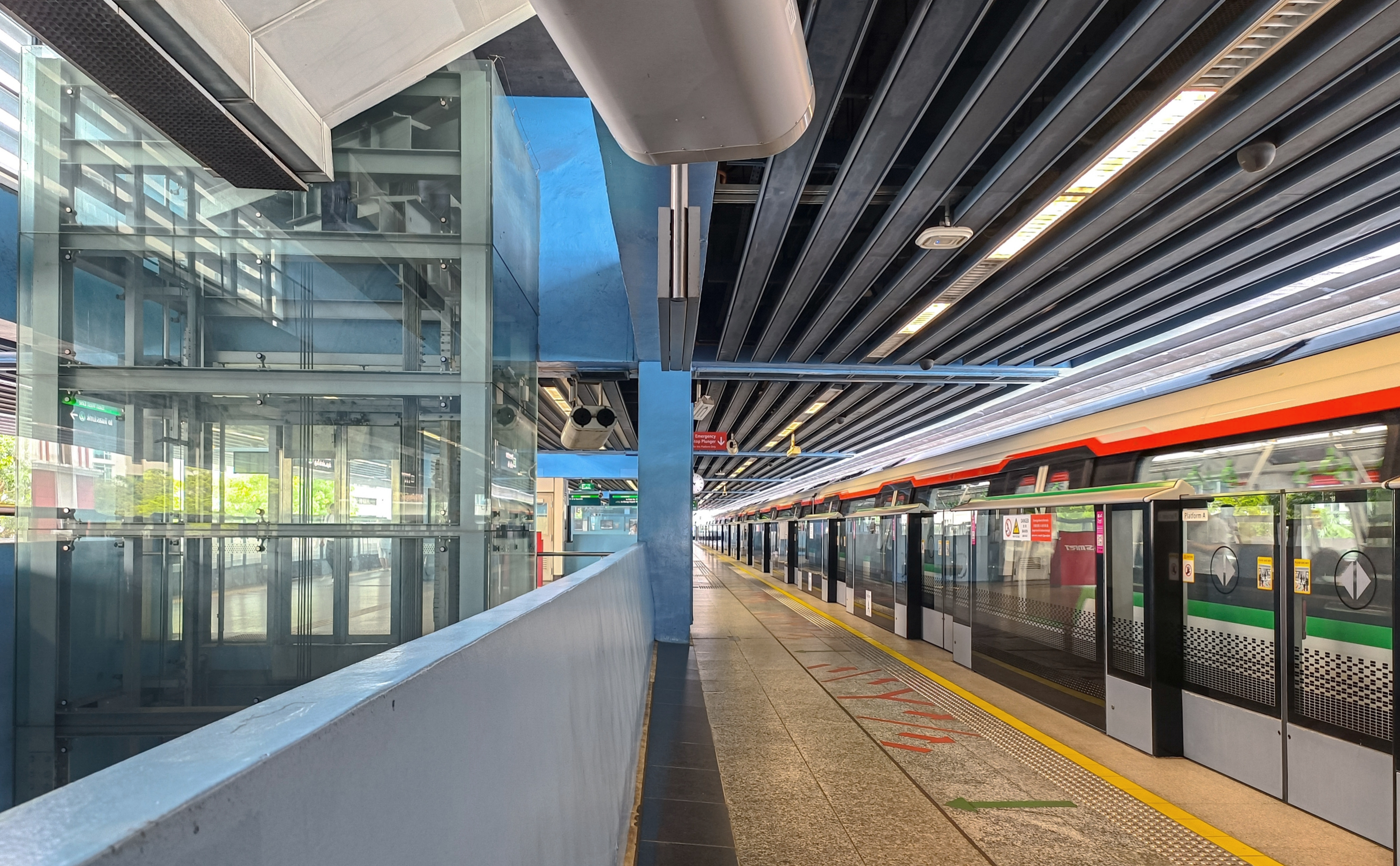
Queenstown's platform and blue walls

The station is on the central reservation of Commonwealth Avenue. It has two exits and serves surrounding landmarks such as Queenstown Primary School, the New Optometry and Ocular Care Centre (NOOCC), Queenstown Stadium, Princess House, and Rainbow Centre Margaret Drive Special School. It also serves several nearby churches such as The True Way Presbyterian Church, Church of the Good Shepherd, Queenstown Baptist Church, and Hephzibah Christian Fellowship. Queenstown is wheelchair-accessible and has bicycle facilities.

Like other stations in the Tiong Bahru-Clementi stretch of Phase IA, it was designed to have an identity similar to Singaporean traditions, according to BSK-BS Konsult's Michael Granit, who was in charge of the design philosophy for Phase IA. Its horizontal louvres, what The Straits Times has described as "brashly coloured grilles which run right round the station, interrupted only by the regularly spaced columns", are equated to French windows in shophouses. Its platform columns can also be equated to the paladium columns in shophouses. The station features blue walls, which was done to make the station "be pleasant to the eye" and to distinguish it from other stations within the stretch. According to the MRTC, the pastel shade of the wall are reminiscent of traditional colours used for shophouses. Additionally, the roof for Queenstown is cantilevered to reduce rain shedding on platforms. It also has horizontal slats to reduce sun exposure to the trains and the apparent height of the upper roof line.
