= Queenstown Driving Test Centre =

Defunct driving test centre in Queenstown, Singapore

Queenstown Driving Centre

General information
- Location: 15 Commonwealth Avenue; Singapore 149725
- Coordinates: 1.294359°N 103.80669°E
- Completed: 1968
- Opened: 23 February 1969
- Closed: 1995
- Demolished: 2014

Technical details
- Floor count: 3

Other information
- Public transit: EW19 Queenstown MRT station

The Queenstown Driving Test Centre was a driving test centre on Commonwealth Avenue in Queenstown, Singapore. Opened in 1969, it was the second driving test centre in Singapore. The centre closed in 1995, after which its former premises were occupied by the Queenstown Neighbourhood Police Centre. The police centre vacated the building in 2005 and it was later demolished to make way for condominiums.

== History ==
The ground-level centre, which cost $285,000 to construct, was completed in 1968. The centre was officially opened by Yong Nyuk Lin, then the Minister for Communications, on 23 February 1969. The centre, which was the second driving test centre in Singapore, was built to lessen the workload of the staff of the Maxwell Driving Test Centre, the first driving test centre in Singapore, which was housed within the Traffic Police Headquarters. The Queenstown test centre was also to take over the Maxwell driving centre's tests for those looking to obtain a license for driving buses or taxis. At its opening, the centre had 14 testers, 150 courses on "driving proficiency" and another 150 on Highway Code. A road tax renewal centre was opened at the building in May 1973.

Construction on an additional two floors for the centre began in June 1975. The levels, which were to be completed by May of the following year, were to meet the centre's "increasing demand for more space." The ground floor was to include a public waiting area, a collection centre and rooms for the centre's chief tester and its cashier. The first floor was to include the rooms for senior officers and testers and the second was to include classrooms, offices and a store. In October 1976, the centre stopped offering provisional driving licence renewals, which were to be offered at post offices from then onwards. Weekend and holiday tests were introduced at the centre in February 1977 to "cut down waiting time." Beginning in November, driving tests for those wishing to operate lorries, cranes and other heavy goods vehicles were to be transferred to the Jurong Driving Test Centre to "ease the concentration of learner drivers" at the Queenstown centre. In March 1978, the Registry of Vehicles announced that it would be opening a licensing and training unit at the building to "upgrade the standard of driving instructors and taxi drivers."

The building ceased to operate as a driving test centre in 1995. In July 1997, it was announced that the Queenstown Neighbourhood Police Centre was to be opened at the building in October. It was officially by then-Minister for Home Affairs Wong Kan Seng on 21 December, with 150 officers serving roughly 140,000 homes at its opening. It was the first Neighbourhood Police Centre. The police centre relocated to a newer complex on Queensway in 2005, after which the building was left vacant. It was marked as a destination on the My Queenstown Heritage Trail, which was established by civic group My Community. In 2014, it was announced that the building would be demolished to make way for condominiums. The Singapore Land Authority granted permission for My Community to hold a carnival and exhibition at the site as a "farewell". The event, which was attended by around 1,000 people, was held on 13 December.
