= Commonwealth Avenue Wet Market =

Retail space in Queenstown, Singapore

Coordinates: 1.2977°N 103.8044°E

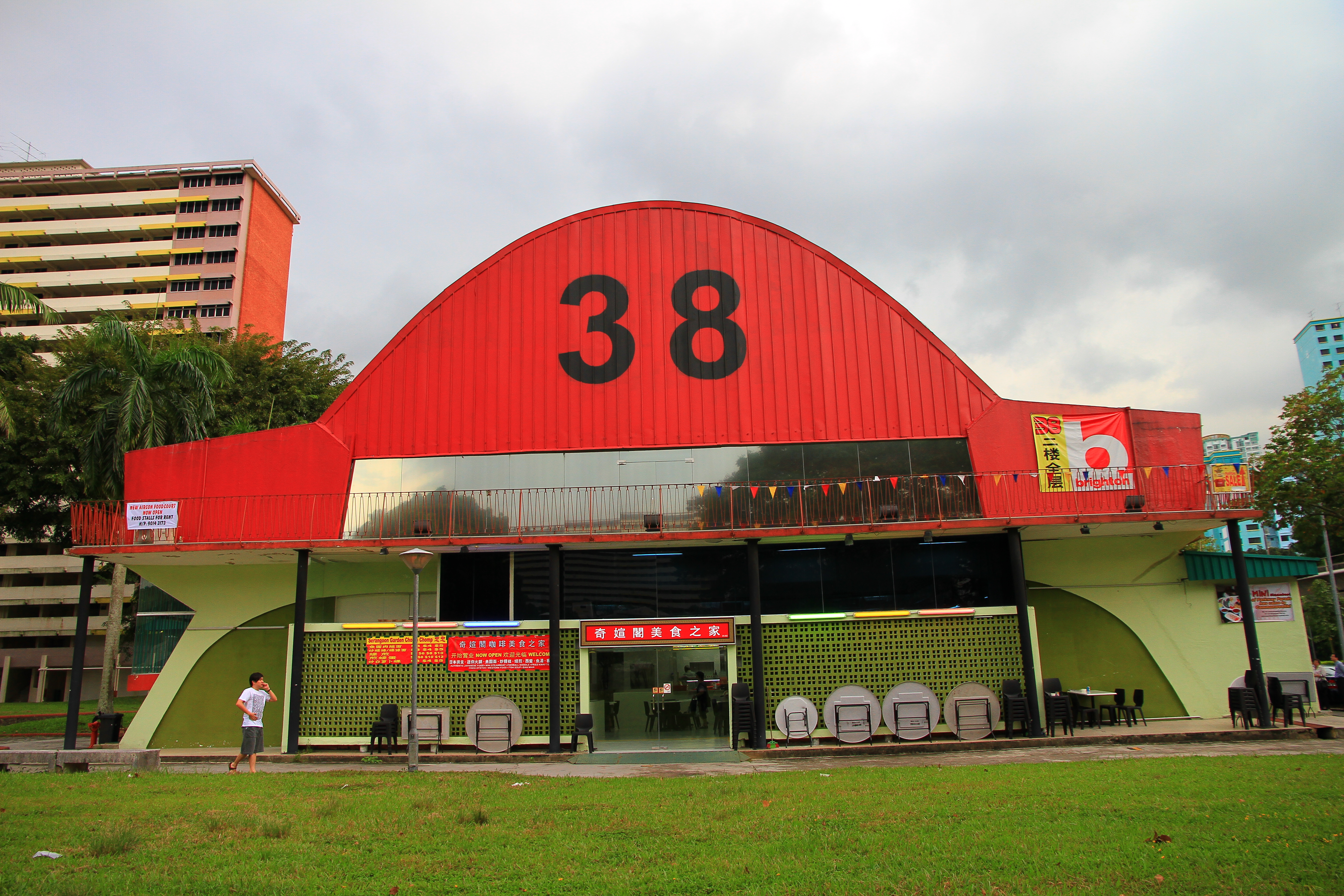
The building in 2011

Commonwealth Avenue Wet Market, also known as Queenstown Market, is a former wet market on Commonwealth Avenue in Queenstown, Singapore. It is the only remaining market designed by the Singapore Improvement Trust. The building is currently used as a retail space under the name Margaret Market.

== Description ==
It was one of the first covered market and food centre, the roof of the former wet market is bold and parabolic-vaulted that allows rainwater to drain quickly. The façade of the former wet market, which resembles a traditional Chinese coffin, caused the market to earn the nickname of "the Coffin Market". A honeycomb screen wall, which can be found on the former wet market's ground floor, keeps the interior of the building ventilated.

The first floor of the wet market contained stalls selling fresh produce and cooked food. The second floor of the market contained sundry and provisional shops.

== History ==
Although it was constructed in 1956, the Commonwealth Avenue Wet Market was officially opened on 23 October 1960 in order to relocate roadside hawkers in the neighbourhood. The wet market was built at a cost of $240,000, and was opened by then assemblyman for Queenstown Lee Siew Choh. The wet market was visited by Queen Elizabeth II in 1972.

The market was closed in 2005 due to poor business caused by the demolition of nearby HDB blocks. The hawkers of the market were relocated to other nearby wet markets. The building was slated for conservation in 2013 by the Urban Redevelopment Authority under the 2013 master plan. The building was gazetted for conservation in 2014. The building has been included in the My Queenstown Heritage Trail by the National Heritage Board.

On 15 August 2023, the building was reopened under the name Margaret Market, with shops selling food and groceries as well as a gym and medical clinic. The master tenant is Bethesda Medical, which operates the clinic.
