= 45, 48 and 49 Stirling Road =

First three blocks completed by the Housing and Development Board

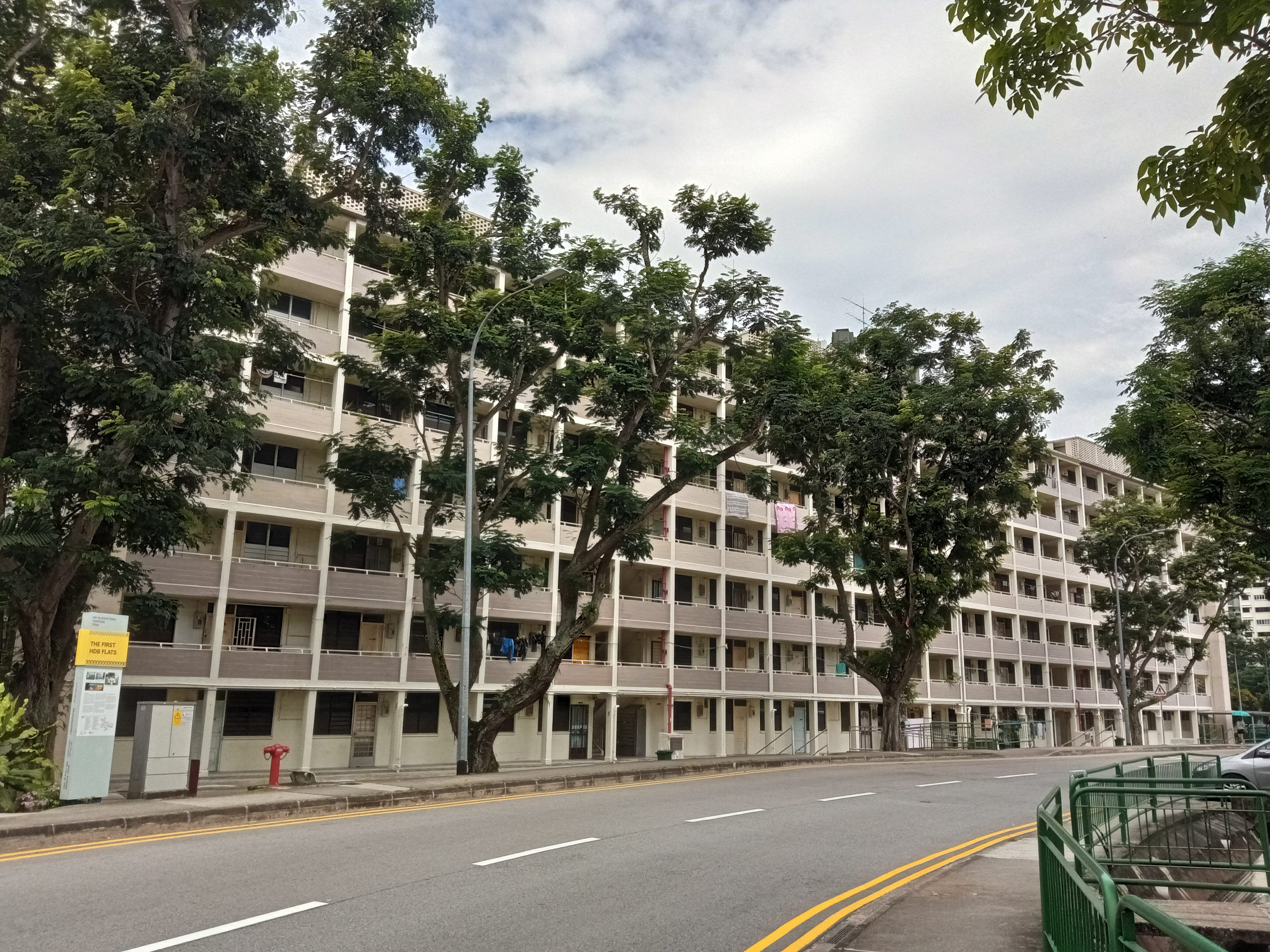
- Block 45 in 2021

General information
- Type: Public residential housing
- Location: 45, 48 and 49 Stirling Rd, Singapore 141045/48/49, Singapore
- Coordinates: 1.2977°N 103.8024°E
- Completed: October 1960; 66 years ago

Technical details
- Floor count: 7

Design and construction
- Developer: Housing and Development Board

45, 48 and 49 Stirling Road are three residential flats on Stirling Road in Queenstown, Singapore. They were the first three public housing blocks completed by the Housing and Development Board (HDB) in 1960, having been previously left unfinished by its predecessor, the Singapore Improvement Trust (SIT). While historically significant, these flats were not the first public housing blocks constructed in Singapore, as SIT flats were already constructed decades prior at Tiong Bahru during the 1930s.

== History ==
45, 48 and 49 Stirling Road were initially to be completed by the Singapore Improvement Trust (SIT). However, while construction on the flats was ongoing, the trust was dissolved and replaced with the Housing and Development Board (HDB). The blocks were completed by the board in October 1960, becoming the first flats to have been completed by the HDB. Residents began moving into the buildings in early 1961. The three blocks are all 7-storeys tall and rental flats. They include one, two and three-room units, with fifteen units on every floor. The buildings feature letterboxes with keyholes, pipe sockets for laundry poles, and rubbish chutes without step pedals at the end of corridors, all of which are no longer usual features of HDB blocks. Block 49 is the only block out of the three with shops on the ground floor.

At the time of construction, the surrounding area was mainly undeveloped swampland. As such, residents began calling the flats qik lao, which is Hokkien for "seven storeys". In 1965, Prince Philip, Duke of Edinburgh, visited a local family living in the flats while being accompanied by then-President Yusof Ishak. The blocks, which were previously orange in colour, were painted grey and beige in June 2016. In recent years, the toilets and the lifts have been upgraded.

The three blocks are most commonly known as the first HDB blocks and were the first flats launched under the HDB's First Five-Year Programme, which aimed to reduce the number of squatters and provide low-cost housing. However, the blocks were both planned and partially built by the Singapore Improvement Trust. The first blocks to have been entirely planned and built by the HDB were in Mattar Road and Merpati Road at Geylang. Built in 1961, the last blocks of that estate (12, 13 and 14) was demolished in 2023. The Stirling Road blocks have been included in the My Queenstown Heritage Trail by the National Heritage Board (NHB).

== Gallery ==
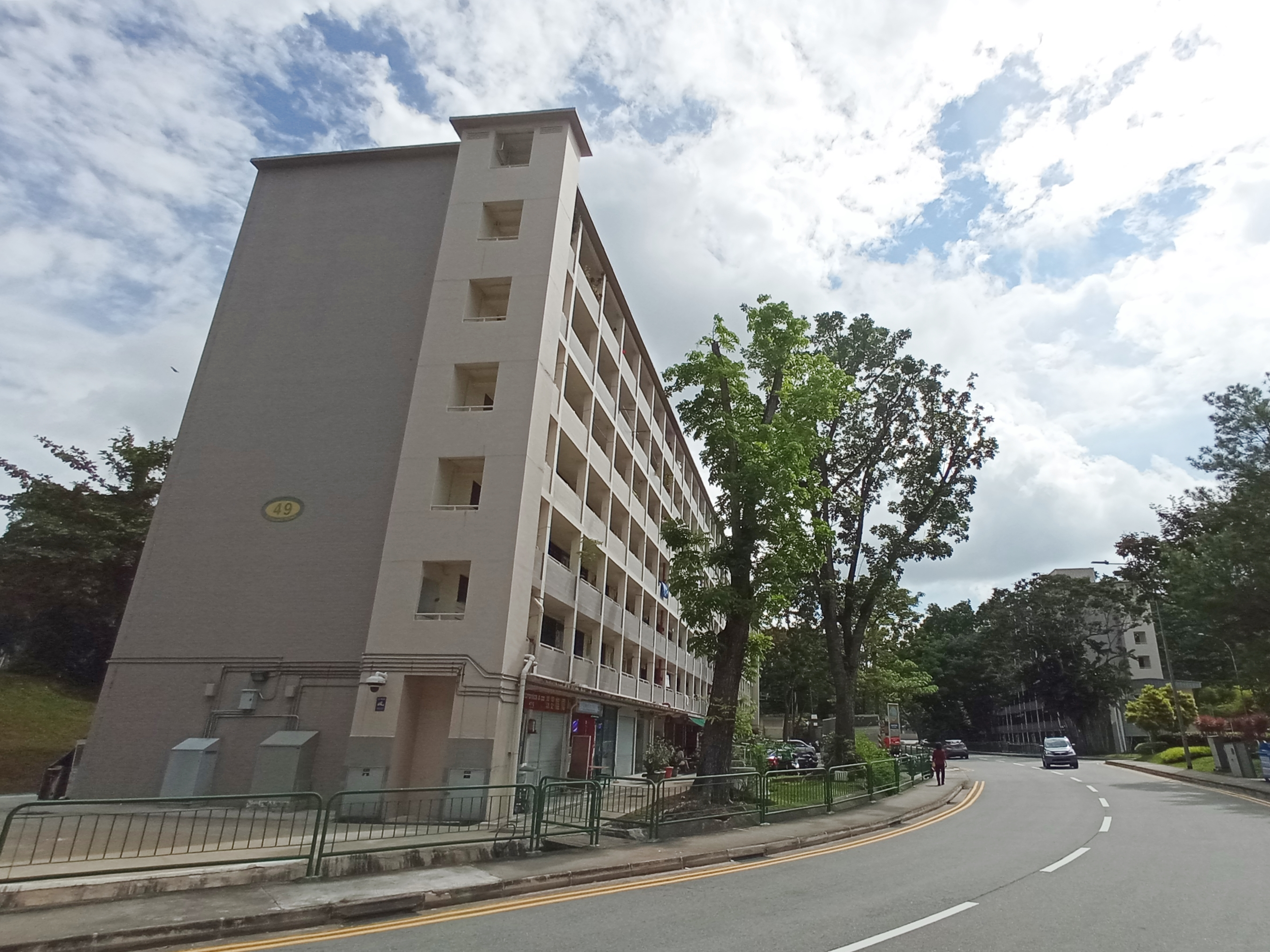
Blocks 48 and 49 in 2021

== See also ==
- 497 Tampines Street 45
