= 497 Tampines Street 45 =

Public housing building in Tampines, Singapore

- Blocks 497J and 497F in 2026, before being painted

General information
- Status: Completed
- Type: Public residential housing
- Architectural style: Exposed brickwork façade
- Location: 497A–H, 497J–L Tampines Street 45, Singapore
- Coordinates: 1°21′35″N 103°57′33″E
- Completed: 1994; 32 years ago
- Owner: Housing and Development Board

Design and construction
- Architecture firm: P&T Consultants
- Engineer: P&T Consultants
- Main contractor: Kajima Overseas Asia

497 Tampines Street 45, officially Tampines Neighbourhood 4 Contract 24 (N4 C24), is a public housing flat (apartment) complex located in Tampines, Singapore. The building consists of ten residential blocks, nine of which are arranged in a wing-shape and create three inner courtyards. Residential units were designed to be similar, albeit with slight deviations, to existing units built by the Housing and Development Board (HDB). The building has an unfinished brick façade, which has received positive reception from architectural experts.

The contract for the building was awarded to Kajima Overseas Asia and the local company P&T Consultants in 1992 as the first project under the Design and Build scheme, a pilot project where companies from the private sector would be contracted by the HDB to build public housing projects. The building was completed in 1994 and received an honourable mention in the Singapore Institute of Architects' Architectural Design Awards in the following year. In August 2026, the HDB held a poll on repainting the blocks to address water seepage, which attracted criticism from some residents; a majority later voted for a scheme matching the closest to the original colour palette.

== History ==
The contract for the construction of 620 flats in Tampines Neighbourhood 4, including 497 Tampines Street 45, was awarded to Kajima Overseas Asia and the local company P&T Consultants against nine other companies for S$71.49 million (US$53.35 million) on 30 April 1992. The building was the first project to be part of the Design and Build scheme, a pilot project where companies from the private sector would be contracted by the Housing and Development Board (HDB) to build public housing projects; this was done to introduce more variety in public housing projects. The winning design was chosen as it was considered by the HDB to be the best design amongst the other competitors, as well as satisfying a set of evaluation criteria, such as keeping costs to be less than S$900 (US$671.64) per square metre of the internal area. The project was expected to be completed by the last quarter of 1994. Works for this flat were finished by the end of 1994, and the project received an honourable mention in the 1995 Singapore Institute of Architects' Architectural Design Awards.

In February 2025, the flat was one of 29,000 HDB flats announced by the HDB to be upgraded. From 31 August 2026, the HDB started a poll for a new colour-scheme of the building as part of a repair-and-paint job to alleviate water leakage. The poll, expected to end by 13 September, offered three colour schemes for the repainting of the building – one option involved a colour scheme that would be closely similar to the original colour scheme; one option was largely similar to the original colour scheme but introduced variations; and the last option would completely change the building's colour scheme. Although the HDB stated that "some [residents] would like a more colourful paint scheme and a move away from the brick façade, while others feel that the exposed brick façades should be preserved because of their distinctive character and heritage value", some residents interviewed by The Straits Times did not want the building's exterior colour scheme to be changed, while others did not want the building to be entirely painted over. On 19 September 2026, David Neo, the local Member of Parliament, announced that a majority of residents had voted for the colour scheme closest to the original.

== Details ==
497 Tampines Street 45 is located in Tampines, Singapore. The flat consists of ten blocks on 5.12 hectares (12.7 acres) of land, lettered from A to L, excluding block I – blocks E, K, and L are car parks. The building has 620 units and was designed with three types of residential units: Type A, similar to an HDB four-room unit; Type B, similar to an HDB five-room unit; and Type C, similar to an HDB Executive flat unit.

According to Alan Low, an architect who led the Kojima–P&T team, 497 Tampines Street 45 had to be designed to be different from HDB flats and existing condominium properties in 1992. Low's team deviated from some elements common in HDB flats during that time, such as providing a service balcony. Additionally, they designed the residential units such that access to the second bathroom was provided from the living room rather than the kitchen. Nine blocks of the building are laid out in a "wing-shaped" plan, which forms three courtyards within the building – two of the courtyards have the building's car parks, which are sunken, while the centre one has a playground.

497 Tampines Street 45 has an exposed brick façade, which was designed not to be adorned with any finishes. In a 1995 review of the project, the Singapore Institute of Architects said, "What is most successful in this project is its sense of identity and presence without having to resort to surface decoration and pastiche. The confident use of brick and its articulation demonstrates a sensitivity not commonly seen nowadays among housing projects, both public and private". Yeo Kang Shua, a professor at the Singapore University of Technology and Design, stated that the building was a part of HDB blocks that had "become very recognisable precisely because of their fair-faced brickwork", adding, "They may not be formally conserved buildings, but that does not mean that their architectural character is without value".

== See also ==
- 45, 48 and 49 Stirling Road
