= Commonwealth MRT station =

Mass Rapid Transit station in Singapore

Commonwealth EW20 联邦 காமன்வெல்த்
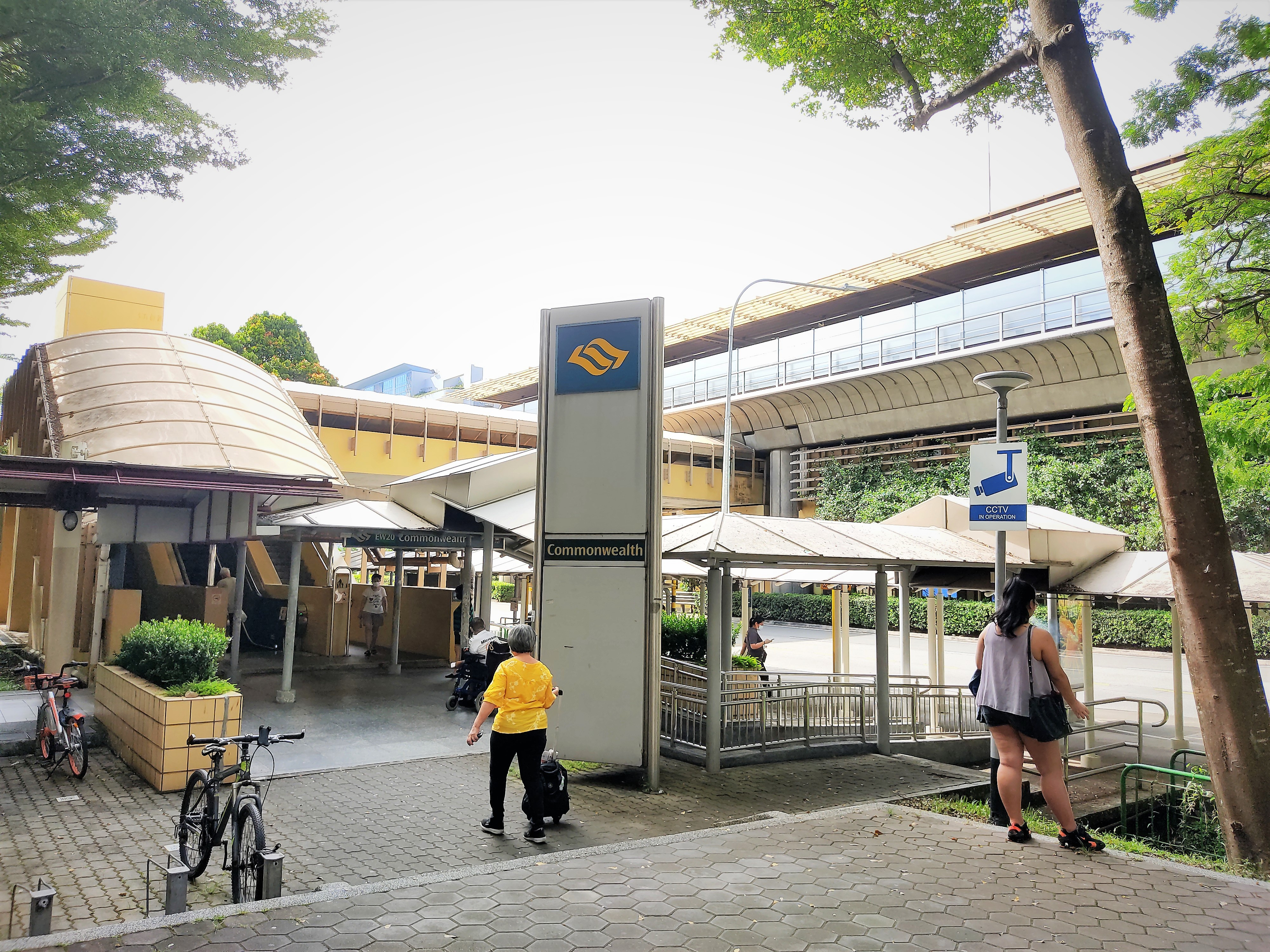
- An entrance to the station with the exterior view in the background.

General information
- Location: 375 Commonwealth Avenue; Singapore 149735
- Coordinates: 1°18′09″N 103°47′53″E
- System: Mass Rapid Transit (MRT) station
- Operator: SMRT Trains (SMRT Corporation)
- Line: East–West Line
- Platforms: 2 (1 island platform)
- Tracks: 2
- Connections: Bus, Taxi

Construction
- Structure type: Elevated
- Platform levels: 1
- Parking: Yes (external)
- Accessible: Yes

History
- Opened: 12 March 1988; 38 years ago
- Former names: Queenstown

Passengers
- June 2024: 11,905 per day (Note: "Land Transport DataMall". mytransport.sg. Land Transport Authority.)

Services
Preceding station	Mass Rapid Transit	Following station
Queenstown towards Pasir Ris	East–West Line	Buona Vista towards Tuas Link
Track layout
Location
- Location within Singapore Rail central area

Commonwealth MRT station is an above-ground Mass Rapid Transit (MRT) station on the East–West Line (EWL) in Queenstown, Singapore. Operated by SMRT Corporation, the station serves nearby landmarks such as the Faith Methodist Church and Queensway Secondary School.

First announced in May 1982 as Queenstown, the station switched names with the then-Commonwealth station in March 1987. It officially commenced operations on 12 March 1988 as part of Phase IA of the MRT, an extension from Tiong Bahru station to Clementi. Accessibility enhancements on the station's facilities were conducted in 2008. Half-height platform screen doors and high-volume low-speed fans were installed by August 2011 and the first quarter of 2013, respectively.

Like other elevated stations on Phase IA, the station feature grilles and horizontal louvres.

== History ==
Commonwealth station was first included with the name Queenstown in the early plans of the MRT system in May 1982. Initially meant to be part of Phase II of the system, it was later announced in June 1983 to be part of Phase IA, an extension of Phase I from Tiong Bahru to Clementi.

In October 1983, eleven local companies, nine of which were joint ventures with foreign businesses, were chosen in the pre-qualification stage out of 38 applications for the design work of Phase IA. In January 1984, it was announced that a five-member joint venture, consisting of Mott, Hay and Anderson, Sir William Halcrow and Partners, BSK-BS Konsult, DP Architects, and the Public Works Department (PWD), had won a S$5.99 million (US$2.81 million) contract for architectural and engineering consultancy as well as the design of the stations.

Ten single tenderers and joint ventures were prequalified for Contract 203 by October 1984, which detailed the construction of Queenstown and Buona Vista stations as well as viaducts from Queensway Circus to Clementi Road. In January 1985, the Mass Rapid Transit Corporation (MRTC) awarded the contract to Kah Ngam Construction and Aoki Corporation for S$70.27 million (US$31.94 million). In March 1987, it was announced that the then-Queenstown and Commonwealth stations would switch names as each station was closer to places using the other name. In February 1988, it was announced that the now-Commonwealth and Queenstown stations would respectively host open houses on 20 and 21 February, with operations expected to start by the middle of March. On 12 March 1988, Prime Minister Lee Kuan Yew officially launched Phase IA as part of a broader expansion of the MRT system.

In 2008, the Land Transport Authority (LTA) conducted accessibility enhancements on Commonwealth MRT station by adding lifts and enhancing existing infrastructure to be barrier-free. Following a rise in track intrusions and commuters slipping when rushing for the train, the LTA and SMRT decided to install platform screen doors. After several successful tests, half-height platform screen doors were installed and commenced operations at all EWL stations by the end of August 2011. It was announced in October 2011 that high-volume low-speed fans would be installed at Commonwealth station by the first quarter of 2013. A new overhead bridge and two new exits were constructed starting mid-2012 and opened on 23 August 2015, the same day as Queenstown station.

== Details ==
Commonwealth station has the station number of EW20 and is situated between Queenstown and Buona Vista stations on the EWL. The original station number of W6 was changed to EW20 in August 2001 as part of a system-wide campaign in response to the expansion of the MRT system. As part of the EWL, the station is operated by SMRT Trains. Like many stations on the initial MRT network, Commonwealth has an island platform and is elevated. The station operates between 5:45 am to 12:12 am on weekdays and Saturdays, with a later opening time on Sundays. Train frequencies vary from 2 to 5 minutes during peak hours to an average of 5 minutes for off-peak hours on weekdays and Saturdays, with frequencies at 4 to 5 minutes during peak hours on Saturday.

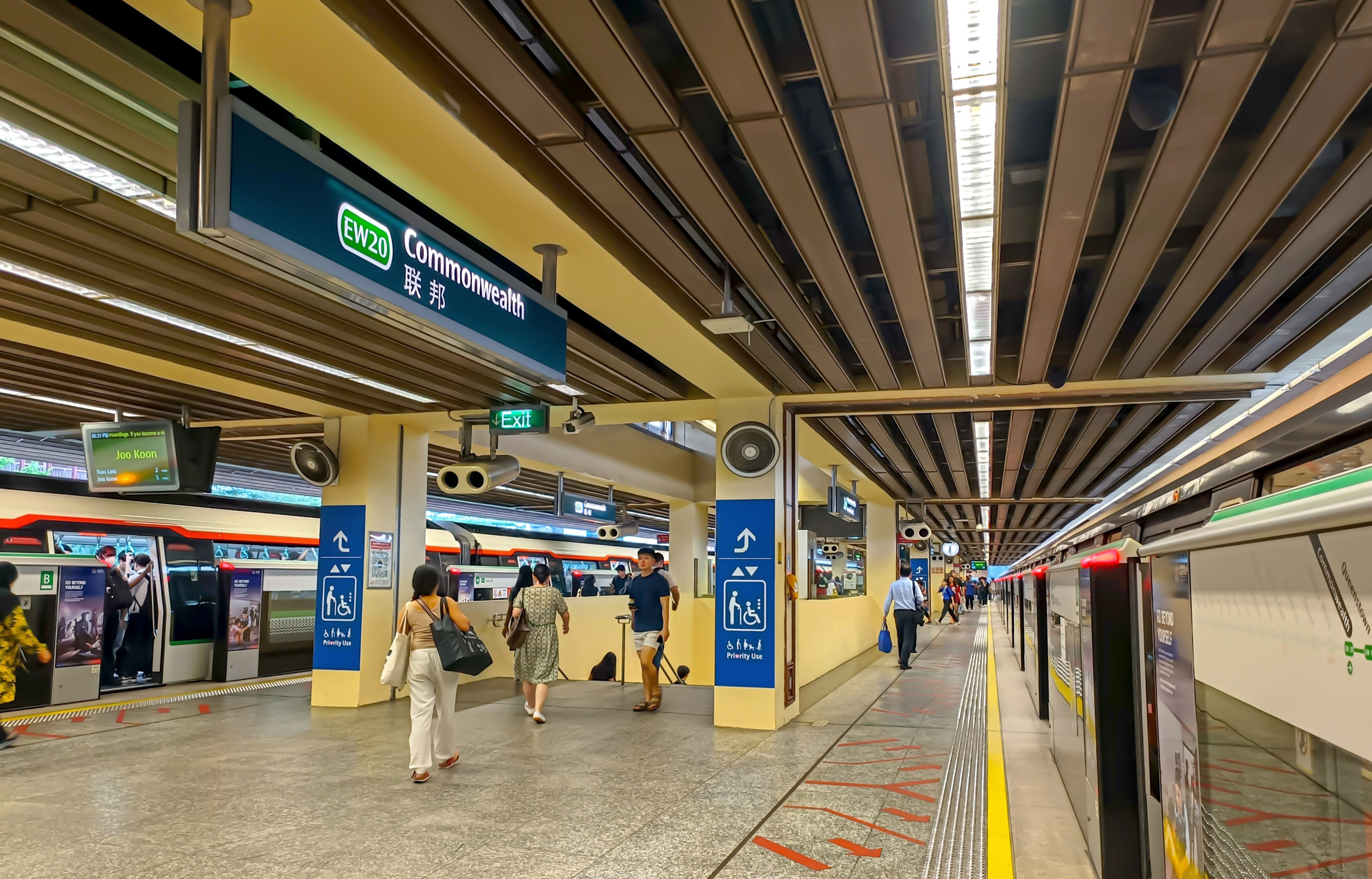
Platform level of Commonwealth station.

Commonwealth station is on Commonwealth Avenue. It has four exits and serves surrounding landmarks such as the Faith Methodist Church, MOE Heritage Centre, and Haw Par Technocentre. It is also near two schools: Queensway Secondary School and New Town Primary School. It is wheelchair-accessible and has bicycle facilities.

According to Michael Granit of BSK-BS Konsult, who was in charge of the design philosophy for Phase IA, stations of the phase were designed to have an identity similar to Singaporean traditions. The station features grilles described by The Straits Times as "brashly coloured" and "run[ning] right round the station, interrupted only by the regularly spaced columns", which are equated to French windows in shophouses. Its platform columns have also been equated to the palladium columns in shophouses. It has walls of a "soothing cream" colour, meant to make it "pleasant to the eye" and distinguish it from other stations in the stretch. According to the MRTC, the pastel shade of the walls is reminiscent of traditional colours used for shophouses. The roof of the station is also cantilevered to reduce rain shedding on platforms. Additionally, it has horizontal slats to reduce the sunlight exposure of the trains and the apparent height of the upper roof line.
