= Commonwealth, Singapore =

Commonwealth
- Subzone of Queenstown Planning Area

Name transcription(s)
  - Chinese: 联邦
  - Pinyin: Liánbāng
  - Malay: Commonwealth
  - Tamil: காமன்வெல்த்
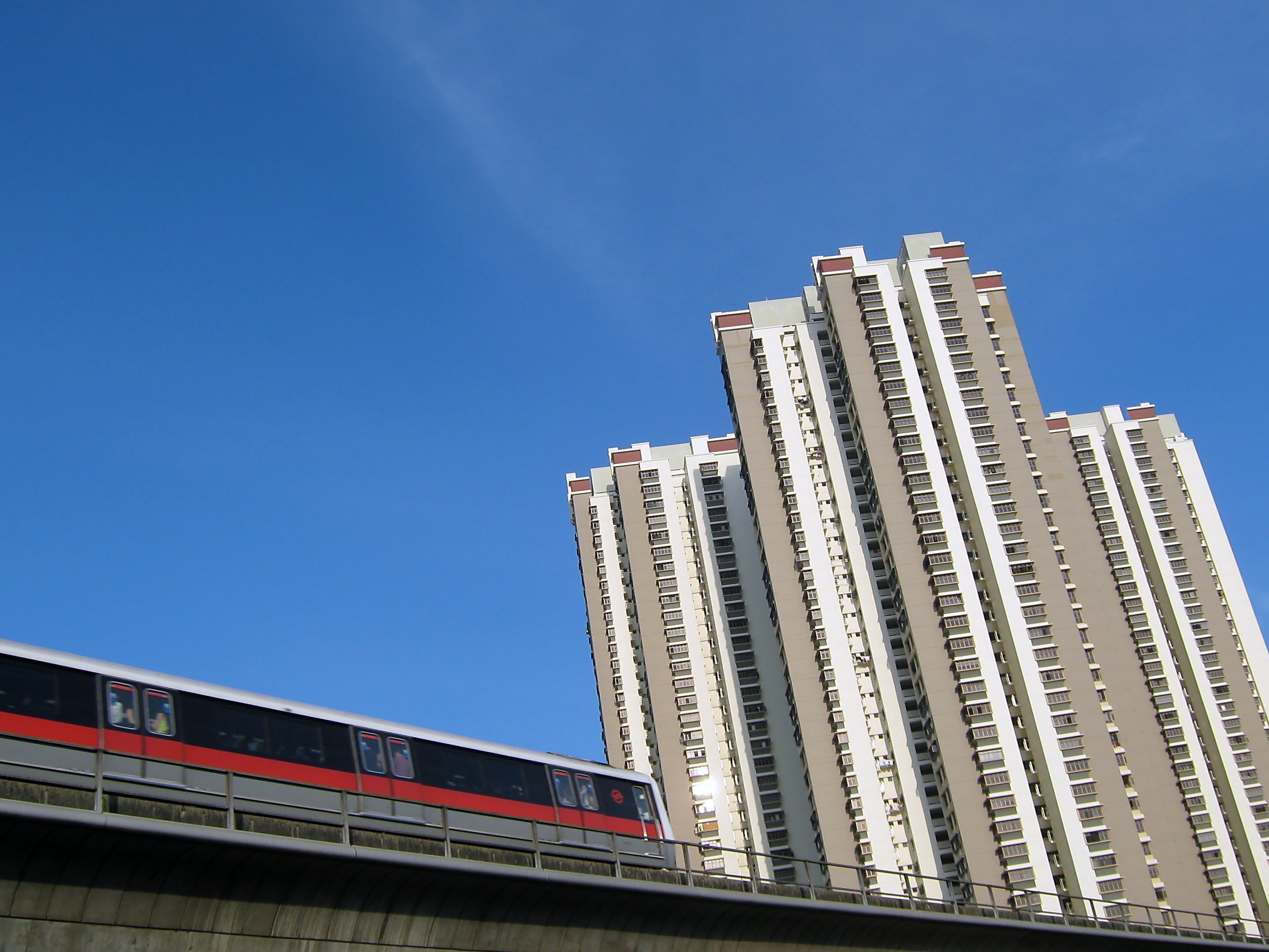
- View of Housing and Development Board flats and the East West MRT line in Commonwealth, Queenstown.
- Interactive map of Commonwealth
- Coordinates: 1.305°N 103.8°E
- Country: Singapore

Commonwealth is a subzone of Queenstown, located in the central-western part of Singapore. It is named after the Commonwealth of Nations. Commonwealth consists of Housing and Development Board flats, and there is one primary school and a secondary school in the area, New Town Primary School and Queensway Secondary School. SBS Transit Bus Services 32, 51, 93, 100, 105, 111, 122, 123, 145, 147, 153, 186, 195, 196, 198, SMRT Buses Services 61, 961/961M & 970 and Tower Transit Singapore Service 855 passes through this area. The nearest Mass Rapid Transit station is Commonwealth MRT station. Amenities in the area include Blessed Sacrament Church, Faith Methodist Church, Masjid Mujahidin Mosque, Queenstown Community Centre, Queenstown Lutheran Church, Ridout Tea Garden, Shuang Long Shan Wu Shu Ancestral Hall, Sri Muneeswaran Temple and Tanglin Halt Food Centre and Market.

== Politics ==
Commonwealth was once part of Queenstown SMC from 1955 to 1988 and subsequently became part of the founding constituencies of Brickworks GRC in 1988 when it was first formed, prior to the 1988 General Election. In 1997, this town became part of the expanded Buona Vista constituency as it was part of Tanjong Pagar GRC when both GRCs merged but Clementi, West Coast, Pasir Panjang and Telok Blangah were carved out to form West Coast GRC. In 2001, Commonwealth itself and the entire Buona Vista ward were being carved out to form Holland-Bukit Panjang GRC and subsequently Holland-Bukit Timah GRC in 2006.

Since then, Buona Vista (including Commonwealth) has since returned to Tanjong Pagar GRC in 2011 and this constituency is currently helmed by the incumbent Minister for Defence Chan Chun Sing.

Today, the entirety of Commonwealth (including Commonwealth Close and Crescent) is managed by Tanjong Pagar Town Council.
