= Queensway Shopping Centre =

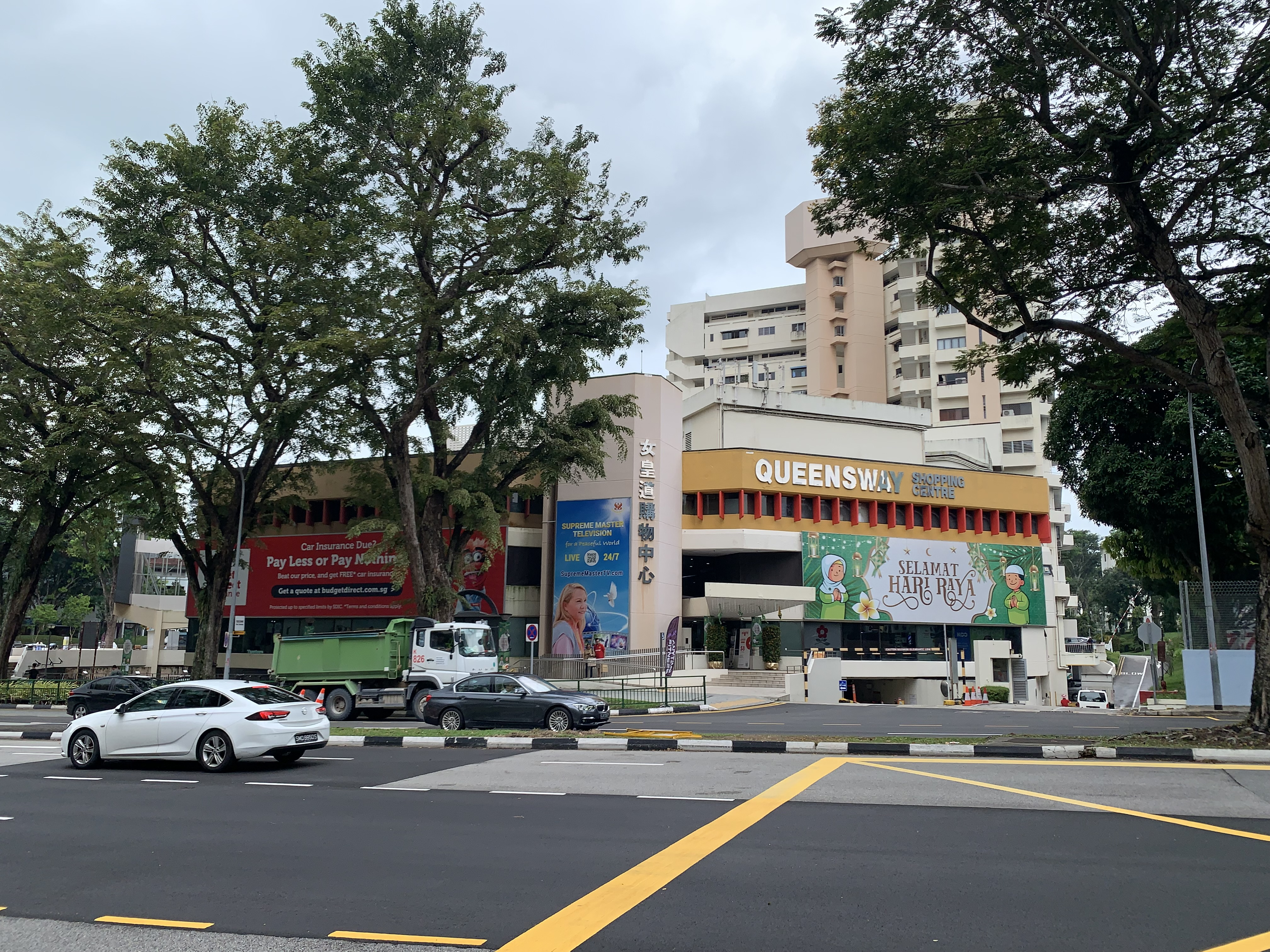
- Queensway Shopping Centre in 2025
- Location: Queenstown, Singapore
- Coordinates: 1°17′15″N 103°48′13″E
- Address: 1 Queensway
- Opened: 1976
- Developer: City Developments Limited
- Num. of stores: 150
- Floors: 5 (1 basement level)
- Website: queenswayshoppingcentre.com.sg

Queensway Shopping Centre is a shopping centre located in Queenstown, Singapore. The mall is one of Singapore's first multi-purpose shopping complexes and comprises 4 levels with a 1-storey basement car park. The mall is also a mixed development which includes a 13-storey apartment tower. Established in 1976, it is one of the oldest malls in Singapore.

== History ==
Built in 1975, the mall was opened in 1976 to provide shopping and recreational options for residents residing in Queenstown and in Brickworks, Bukit Merah. Dubbed by locals as "Singapore’s Sports Mall", the mall has been a popular spot for sporting items since its establishment.

== Architecture ==
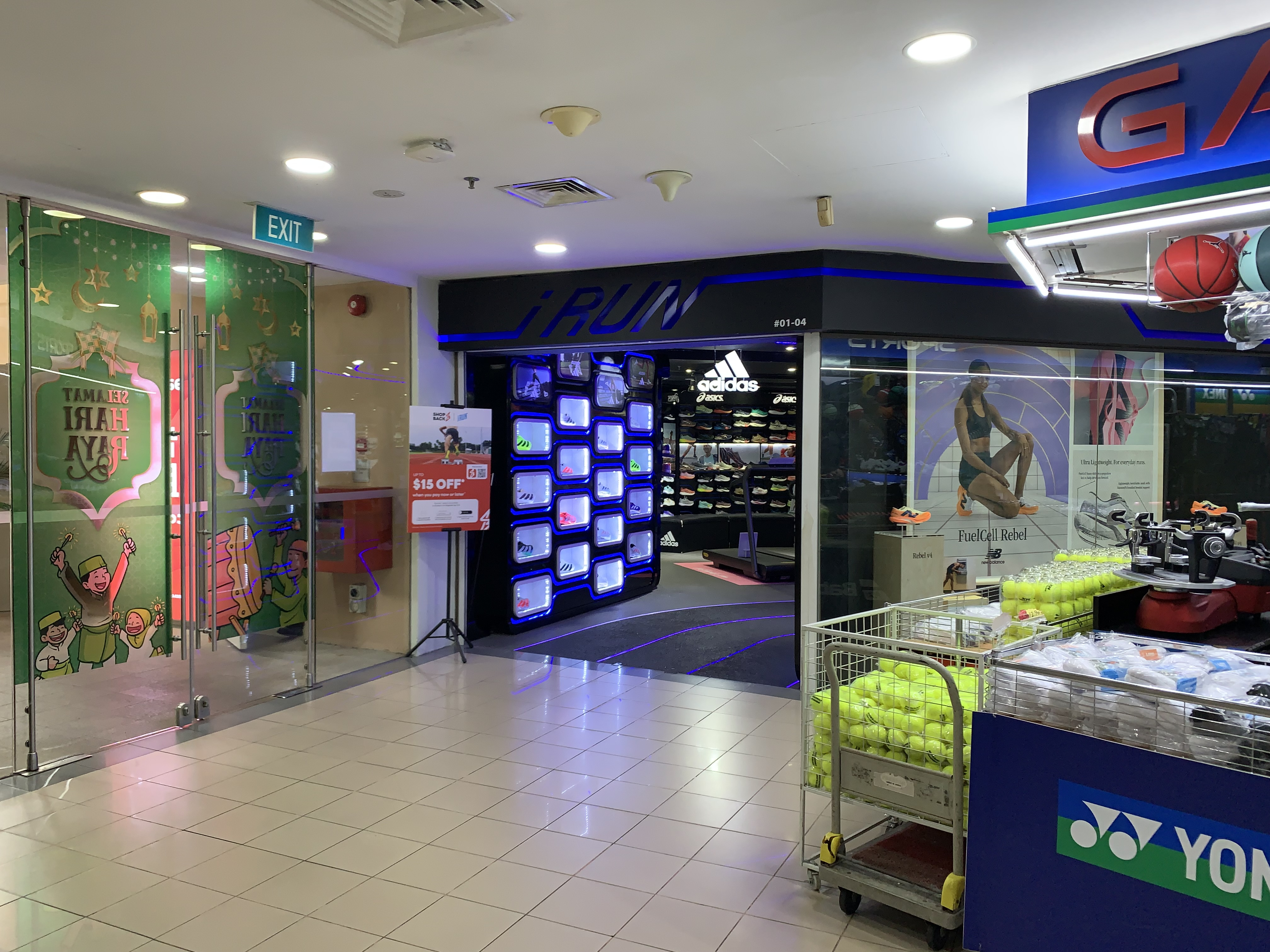
Interior of Queensway Shopping Centre, as of 2025

Designed in modern architecture style, the mall is characterised by its octagonal facade and sunken central concourse. Units which are located near the concourse features display windows across two levels.

The layout of the mall is made up of a series of concentric circles radiating outwards, which makes it look like an octagon. With its unique trigram shape layout, many shoppers get lost within the mall.

The mall comprises 150 shops with a tenant mix of sporting goods, apparels, spectacles, printing services and tailor services. At present, it is one-stop destination for both sporting goods and vintage apparel, particularly in streetwear. It also features the first public escalators installed in Singapore.
