= High-volume low-speed fan =

Large machine for producing air flow

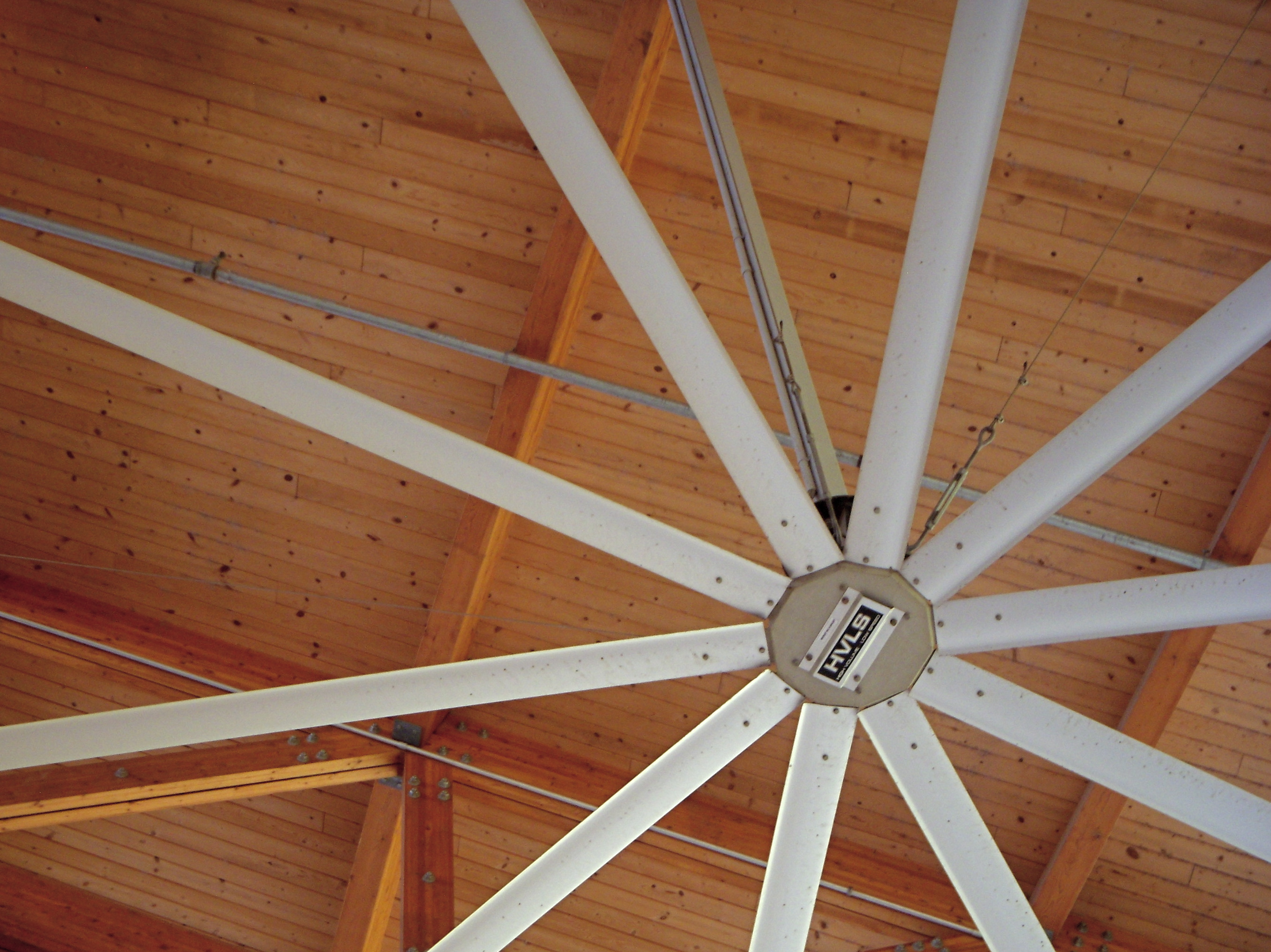
A high-volume low-speed fan

A high-volume low-speed (HVLS) fan is a type of mechanical fan greater than 7 feet (2.1 m) in diameter. HVLS fans are generally ceiling fans, although some are pole-mounted.

Typical applications for HVLS fans fall into two classifications—industrial and commercial. In industrial applications, HVACR is often cost prohibitive or impractical, and is usually only used for refrigerated warehouses or the manufacture of refrigerated or frozen foods. Fans installed in spaces like warehouses, barns, hangars and distribution centers can prevent heat stress, increase worker comfort and the productivity of both workers and livestock. HVLS fans are also used in commercial spaces, where air conditioning is more common, but increased air movement from ceiling fans can cost-effectively augment occupant comfort or prevent stratification. Typical commercial applications include shopping malls, churches, office buildings, airport terminal buildings, fitness centers and schools.

== History ==
In the late 1990s, William Fairbank, a professor at the University of California at Riverside, and Walter K. Boyd, founder of MacroAir Technologies, invented and patented a new type of circulator fan, first called a High-Volume, Large-Diameter (HVLD) fan. This type of fan was originally developed for agricultural applications, so early research focused on the benefits of HVLS fans on dairy production.

== Operation ==
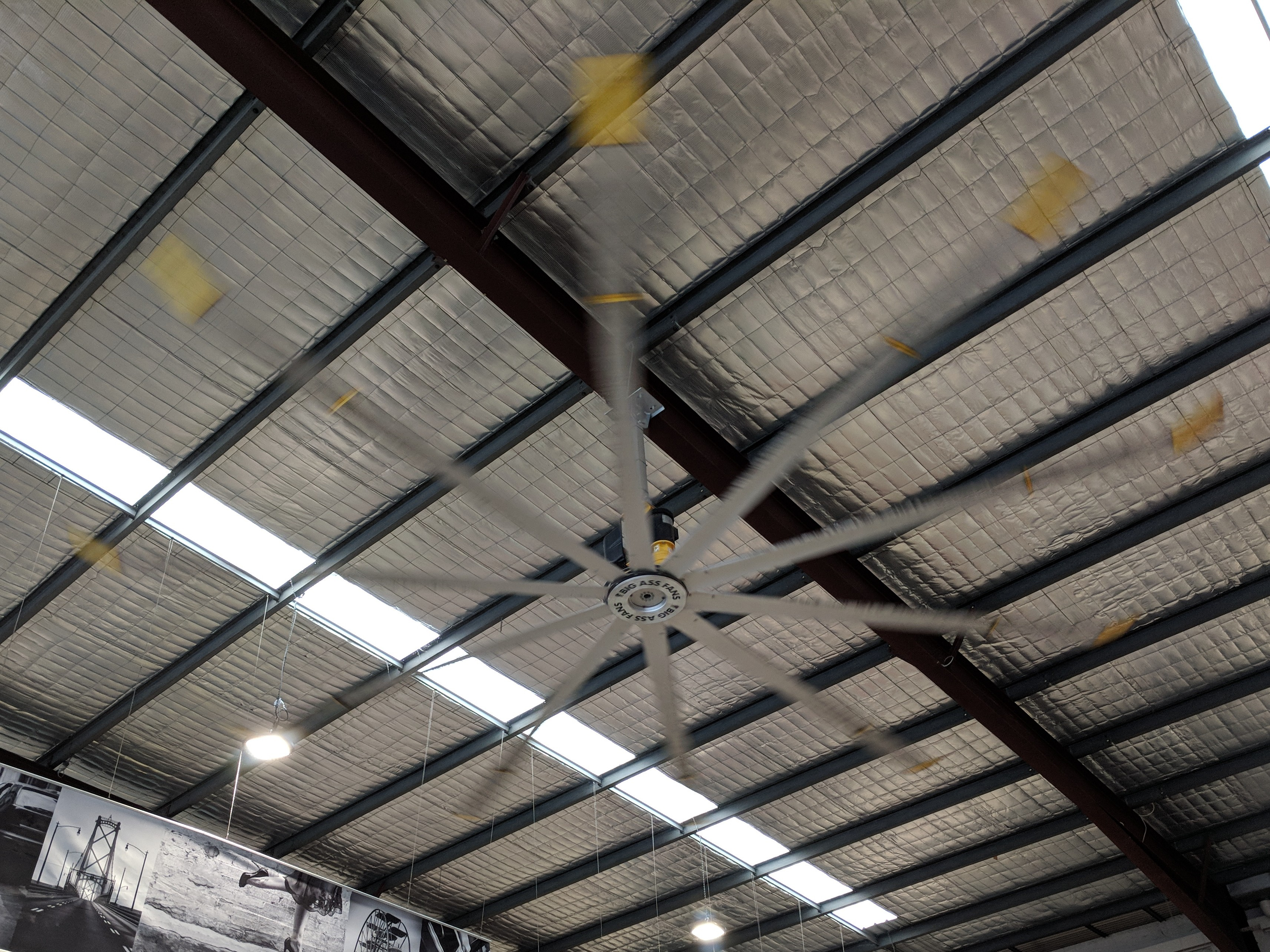
A HVLS fan spinning in a store in Sydney

HVLS fans work on a principle of utilizing a significant increase in blade surface area, instead of speed/velocity, as a means of moving a large volume of air at low speeds. Taking greater advantage of a standard air moving principle where air movement breaks up the moisture-saturated boundary layer surrounding the body and accelerates evaporation to produce a cooling effect. Ceiling fans produce a column of air as they turn. This column of air moves down and out along the floor. Called a horizontal floor jet, this deep wall of horizontal moving air is relative to the diameter of a fan, and to a lesser degree, the speed of a fan. Once the floor jet reaches its potential, it migrates outward until it meets a side wall or other vertical surface. The blades are airfoils.

Under ideal conditions, an 8-foot-diameter (2.4 m) fan produces a floor jet of air approximately 36 inches (910 mm) deep. A 24-foot-diameter (7.3 m) fan produces a floor jet 108 inches (2,700 mm) deep, tall enough to engulf a human standing on the floor or a cow, its initial development purpose.

=== Large fans versus small fans ===
Larger diameter fans can move more air than smaller fans at the same speed. A turbulent, high velocity air jet dissipates very quickly. A large column of air, however, "travels" farther than a small one due to the friction between moving air and stationary air, which occurs at the periphery of the moving column.

The perimeter of an air column varies directly with column diameter. While the cross-sectional area varies with the square of the diameter, the large column has proportionately fewer peripheries, and therefore less drag. The air column from a 3-foot-diameter (0.91 m) fan, therefore, has more than six times as much friction interface per volume of air moved as does the air column from a 20-foot-diameter (6.1 m) fan.

When the down column of air from an HVLS fan reaches the floor, the air turns in the horizontal direction away from the column in all directions. The air flowing outward is called the "horizontal floor jet." Since the height of the floor jet is determined by the diameter of the column of air, a larger diameter fan naturally produces a larger air column and thus a higher floor jet.

Smaller high-speed fans of equivalent displacement are incapable of producing the same effect.

The power to drive a fan increases roughly with the cube of the average air speed through the fan. A commercial fan delivering air at 20 miles per hour (mph) requires about 64 times as much power as a similar sized fan delivering air at five mph.

Airspeed, combined with fan "effectiveness," means that when the objective is to cool people or animals, very large, low-speed commercial fans are more efficient and effective than small high-speed fans.

=== Measuring fan performance ===
In general, Air Movement and Control Association Standard 230 sets uniform testing procedures for determining ceiling fan performance.

AMCA 230 establishes uniform methods of laboratory testing for air circulating fans in order to determine performance in terms of thrust for rating, certification or guarantee purposes. The 1999 version described a method to determine the thrust developed and used a simple equation to convert the measured thrust to airflow. During the periodic review process, it was determined that the calculated airflow was too high; therefore this version no longer artificially calculates airflow, but leaves the measured performance in units of thrust.

The current version, AMCA 230–12, reintroduced airflow rate with a revised equation, and new efficiency metrics. The official scope of the standard was limited to ceiling fans under 6 feet (1.8 m) in diameter. Therefore, the current standard does not apply to HVLS fans. A new version of the standard is currently under review.

== Heating and cooling benefits ==
Air movement can have a significant influence on human thermal comfort. Wind chill in cold conditions is considered detrimental, but air movement in neutral to warm environments is considered beneficial. This is because normally under conditions with air temperatures above about 74 °F (23.3°C), the body needs to lose heat in order to maintain a constant internal temperature.

Unlike air conditioners, which cool rooms, fans cool people. Ceiling fans increase air speed at the occupant level, which facilitates more efficient heat rejection, cooling the occupant, rather than the space. Elevated air speed increases the rate of convective and evaporative heat loss from the body, thus making the occupant feel cooler without changing the dry bulb temperature of the air.

Hot air is less dense than cold air, which causes hot air to naturally rise to the ceiling level through a process called convection. In still air, layers of constant temperature form, the coldest at the bottom and the warmest at the top. This is called stratification. The most efficient and effective way of mixing the air in a stratified space is to push the hot air down to the occupant level. This allows for complete mixing of the air in the space while decreasing both heat loss through the building walls and roof, and building energy consumption. To avoid causing a draft, fans need to be run slowly so that air speed at the occupant level does not exceed 40 feet per minute (12 m/min).
