= Surau Ghim Moh =

Muslim prayer space in Queenstown, Singapore

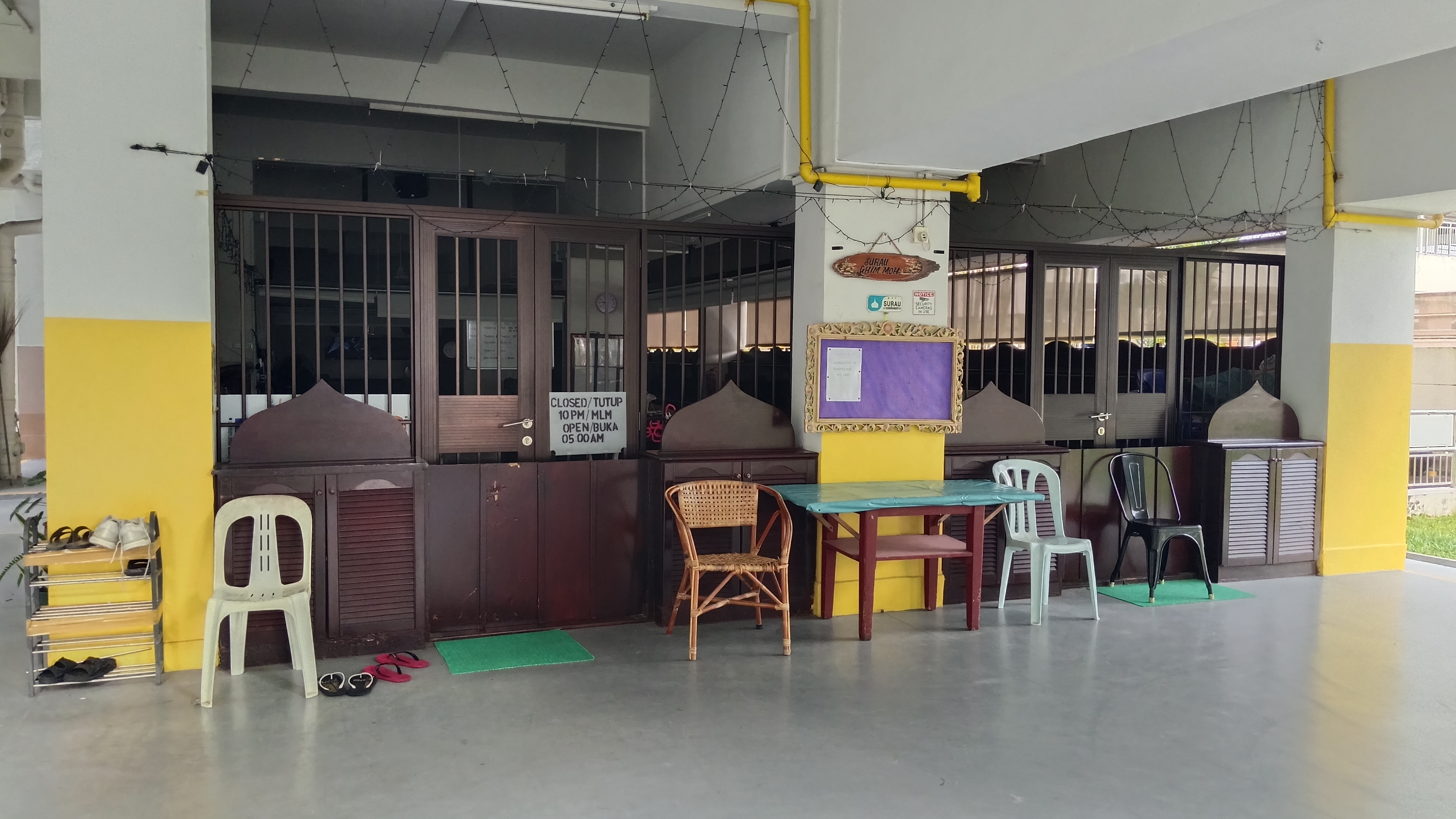
- Main facade of the surau, with entrance and rack for footwear.

- Location in Singapore

Religion
- Affiliation: Sunni Islam

Location
- Location: 2 Ghim Moh Rd, Singapore 270002
- Country: Singapore
- Interactive map of Surau Ghim Moh
- Coordinates: 1.3124128°N 103.7875129°E

Architecture
- Established: 1981
- Capacity: 100

Surau Ghim Moh is a surau located in the Ghim Moh residential area within Buona Vista, Singapore. Established in 1978, it is one of three active suraus in the country, the other two being Surau Al-Firdaus at Kampong Lorong Buangkok and Surau MacAlister in the Singapore General Hospital.

== History ==
The surau was established in 1978 by Ahmad Basar, a Muslim resident of Buona Vista. It was situated in the void deck underneath the second apartment block of the Ghim Moh housing estate. The main purpose of the surau was to provide an accessible place of worship for the Muslim residents in the area, due to the fact that the nearest mosque, Masjid Kampong Holland, was only accessible by bus and hence was not convenient for the elderly. When the idea for a surau in the void deck was proposed in the 1970s, the Housing and Development Board (HDB) initially rejected the proposal due to concerns that the surau would make the void deck less inclusive, although they later approved the construction of the proposed surau after persuasion from Muslim politicians Abbas Abu Amin and Ahmad Mattar.

Surau Ghim Moh started out as an enclosure made from canvas and cardboards in the void deck. In 1981, sufficient funding as well as approval from the local Town Council allowed for a proper wooden enclosure to be built, complete with a carpeted wood-tiled floor, ablution area, window binds, as well as electric fans and lighting to illuminate and ventilate the place. A wooden minbar was also installed in the surau, to be used during the sermon given after the Eid prayers. One of the first preachers to give a sermon at the surau and stand on the pulpit was Tony Castello, a Eurasian convert to Islam and former actor who starred in the 1956 Malay film Anak-ku Sazali.

During the COVID-19 pandemic in 2021, the surau was one of two Islamic prayer places that were kept active during a nationwide closure of mosques, the other being Surau Al-Firdaus at Kampong Lorong Buangkok.

== Transportation ==
Surau Ghim Moh is located in the void deck underneath Block 2 along Ghim Moh Road. It is also situated within walking distance of the Ghim Moh bus terminal and interchange.

== See also ==
- List of mosques in Singapore
