= Masjid Kampong Holland =

Mosque in Holland Village, Singapore (1988–2014)

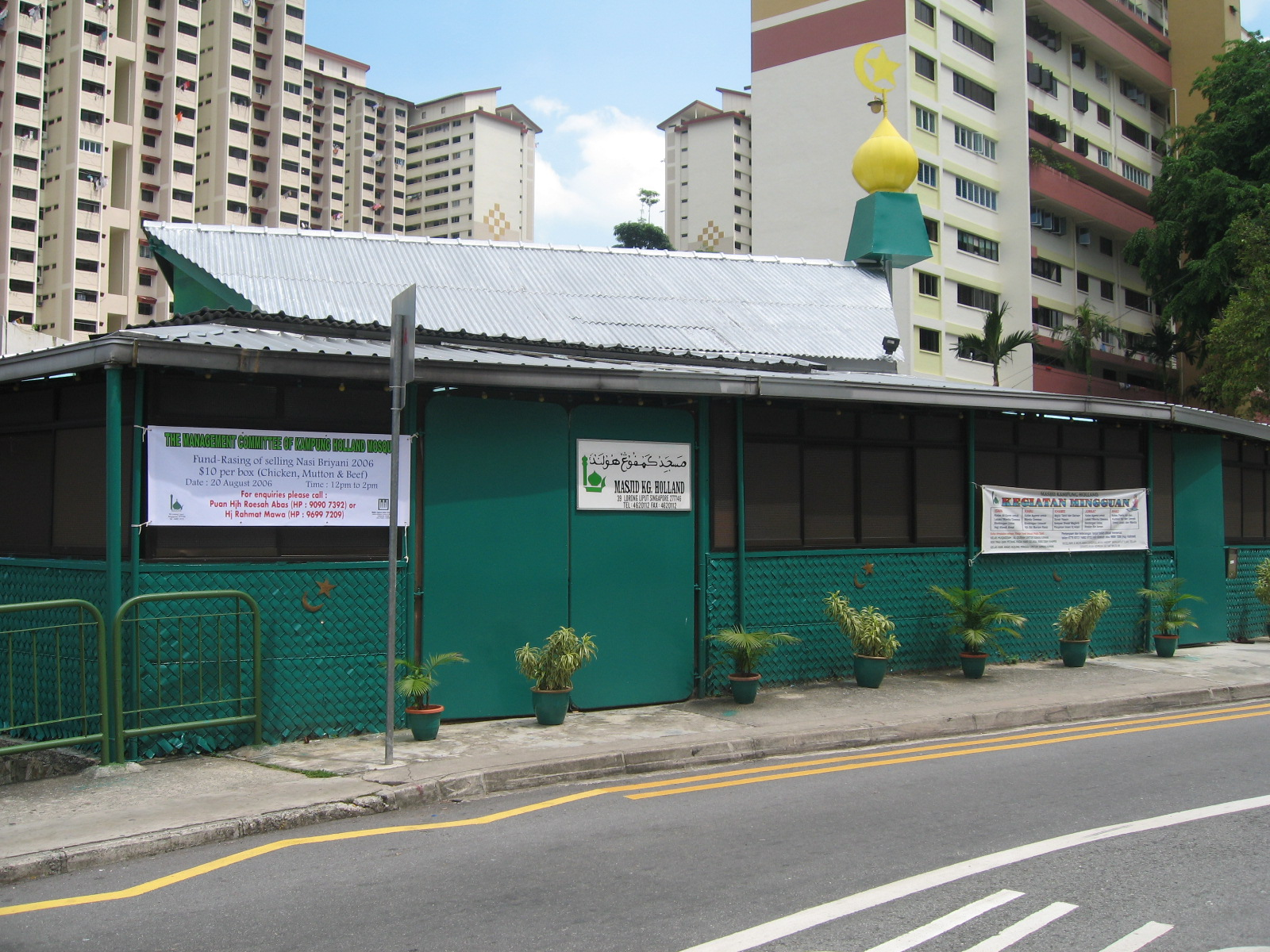
- Masjid Kampong Holland in 2006.
- Interactive map of Masjid Kampong Holland
- Singapore 1°18′38″N 103°47′41″E
- Type: Surau (1974–1988); Mosque (1988–2014)
- Location: Holland Village, Singapore

History
- Built: 1974
- Demolished: 2014

Site notes
- Architectural style: Islamic architecture
- Governing body: Housing and Development Board

Masjid Kampong Holland (lit. 'Holland Village Mosque', Jawi: مسجد كامبونج هولاند) was a surau-turned-mosque in the Holland Village district of Buona Vista, Singapore. It was built in 1974 by a resident committee from Buona Vista with approval from the Majlis Ugama Islam Singapura (MUIS) and was converted to a mosque in the 1980s. It was later demolished in order to make way for the redevelopment of Holland Village.

== History ==
=== Establishment as a surau (1974) ===
In the early 1970s, a committee of residents from Buona Vista was formed to establish a surau after proper approval from the Majlis Ugama Islam Singapura (MUIS) had been given. This surau was to be established in the Holland Village district and received a donation of $4,000 from the chairman of a nearby mosque, Masjid Ellis Road, to fund its construction. The total cost for the construction of the surau, including its maintenance, added up to $27,000. Surau Kampong Holland was ultimately completed on 12 July 1974, but it would only be inaugurated by the MUIS on 19 August 1974, ten days after the National Day celebrations. In December 1974, the first Eid prayer was held at the surau. Additionally, the MUIS authorised the surau for collection of the Zakat al-Fitr payments.

=== Conversion into a mosque (1988) ===
Due to its status as a surau, it was not authorised to host the Friday prayer, leading to surau committee member Baba Abdul Samat writing to the MUIS and requesting the surau be converted into a mosque in 1976. This request was eventually approved, with the surau being converted into a mosque in 1988 although it was placed under a Temporary Occupation Licence (TOL) unlike the majority of mosques in the country. The surau, now known as Masjid Kampong Holland, experienced a decrease in attendance over time in the 2000s, and by 2011 it had become a largely forgotten landmark of Holland Village. The construction of the Holland Village MRT station on the Circle Line also resulted in the mosque being overshadowed by the newly developed buildings around the above ground premises of the station. However, it continued with its weekly Friday prayer and regular services such as zakat tax collection, madrasa classes and sermons.

=== Demolition ===
On 4 July 2012, the MUIS announced that Masjid Kampong Holland would be decommissioned in 2014. In November 2013, the Housing and Development Board (HDB) attempted to extend the lease period of Masjid Kampong Holland, which was successful and gave the mosque four additional months to operate. The nearest mosque, Masjid Mujahidin, was extensively renovated in order to increase its capacity to accommodate more worshippers, expecting the usual congregation of Masjid Kampong Holland to flock to it after their frequented mosque had been demolished. The committee of the soon to be demolished mosque also made preparations to continue their employment as part of an extended committee of Masjid Mujahidin.

After 30 April 2014, Masjid Kampong Holland was closed and then demolished, being razed to the ground. The empty flat land stood vacant until 2023, when it was used to construct several new retail outlets in the Holland Village area, which included the mixed-use residential and retail centre, One Holland Village.

== Reactions to the demolition ==
Former residents of Holland Village were reportedly sorrowful when the mosque was announced to be demolished in 2014. Priscilla Teo, a Buddhist resident of Buona Vista, expressed her sadness to the Berita Harian press in an interview, explaining to the press that she had been one of the highest donors of the mosque since 2010. The committee of Masjid Kampong Holland also accepted the fate of the mosque and published accounts of their relatively positive experiences working in the mosque. Larger mosques in the Queenstown area also made preparations for a larger congregation on Friday prayers and festive events, expecting the former congregants of Masjid Kampong Holland to join in.

Worshippers at Masjid Kampong Holland would eventually shift to the smaller Surau Ghim Moh after 2014, using the surau as a place to conduct their daily prayers. Said surau also gained prominence in 2019 after a video of it went viral.

== See also ==
- List of mosques in Singapore
