= Surau =

Place of worship for Muslims in Asia

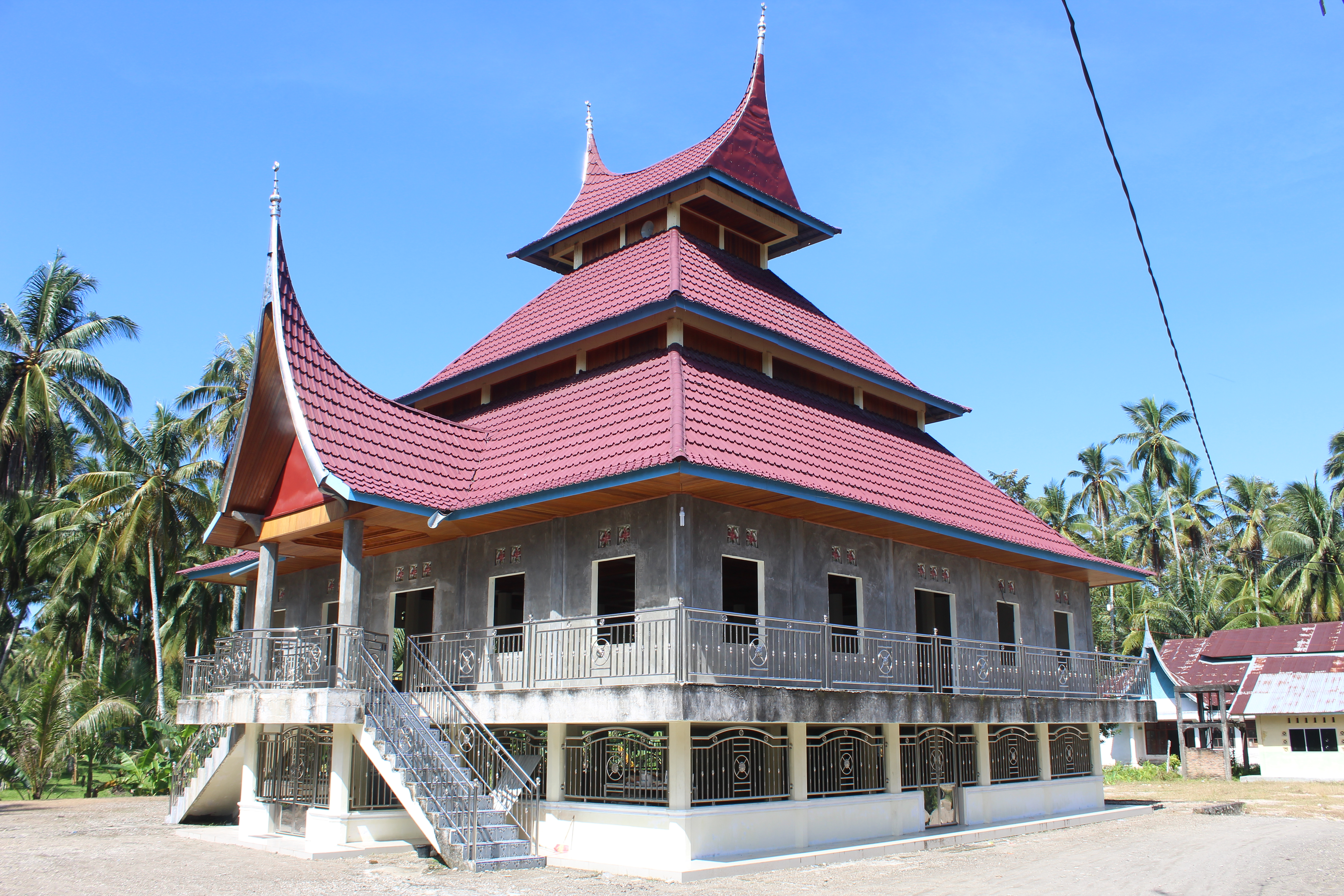
- A traditional surau in Padang Pariaman, West Sumatra, Indonesia

General information
- Type: Religious building
- Architectural style: Indonesian; Malay
- Location: West Sumatra (initially); Malaysia; Singapore; Thailand

A surau (Jawi: سوراو) is an Islamic assembly building, originating in West Sumatra and later becoming common and institutionalised in Malaysia, and found throughout Singapore and Thailand. Adapted from pre-Islamic assembly buildings, surau serve a similar purpose as a mosque and are used for the prayers as well as religious classes and as a local public space. A typical surau is located in a village or town and is built either in an architectural style native to the locality or in typical Islamic style.

In contemporary times, the word surau is also synonymous with musalla and refers to prayer rooms in public facilities.

== History ==
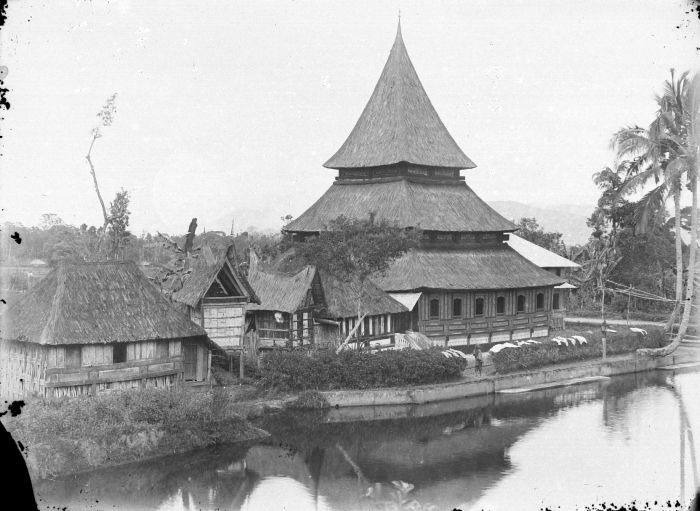
Bingkudu Mosque, an archetypal Minangkabawi mosque, with its multi-tiered, curving form and exaggerated roof height

Surau originated in West Sumatra amongst the Minangkabau people around 1356 as a place of worship for Hindus and Buddhists, both of which were majority religions at the time. Amongst the Batak people, the term "surau" was used to describe a wooden house that was used for ancestor worship, similar to a miniature temple. When the Islamic religion spread to West Sumatra, surau became a place for Muslims to perform their five daily prayers, akin to a mosque. Surau eventually spread to the Malay Peninsula. They also became known as places for exclusively male education, a trait that faded after the introduction of modern schools.

During the Padri Wars of the 19th century, the reformist Padris, who were influenced by the Wahhabis of Najd, condemned the building of surau as places of idolatry and even burned many of them. This was mainly due to the fact that many surau were Sufi institutions. These events, along with the introduction of secular schools by the Dutch colonial government in 1870 and opposition from Muslim modernists led to the decline of surau in Indonesia.

In Indonesian contemporary times, surau became synonymous with musalla and were used to describe prayer rooms in shopping malls, petrol stations, hospitals, and schools. There has been a revival of surau usage among the Minangkabau.

== Outside West Sumatra ==
=== Malaysia ===
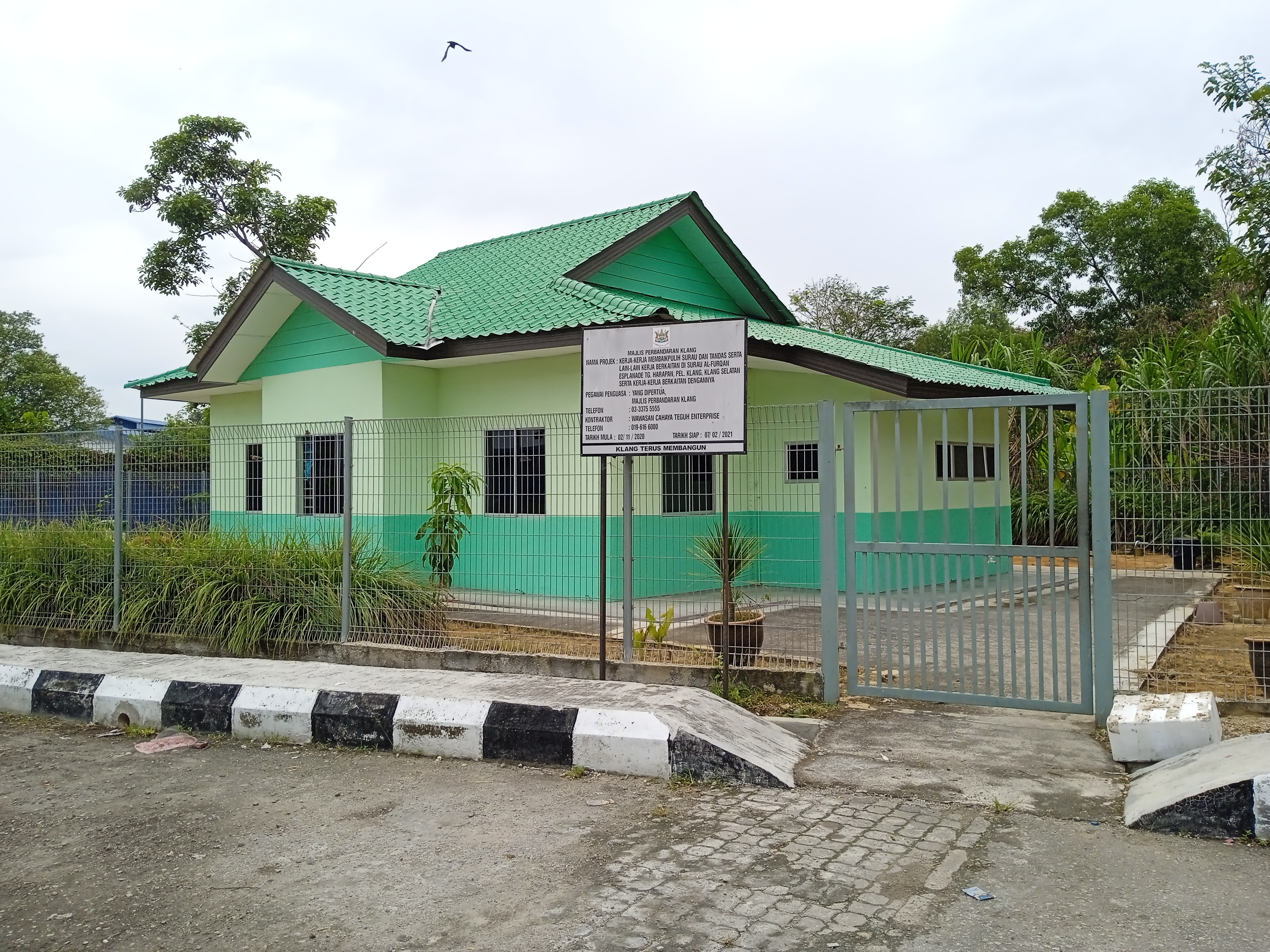
A surau in Port Klang, Malaysia

Surau are institutionalised and therefore common in Malaysia, with a presence mainly in towns and villages, but still common and widespread within cities as subclasses to mosques.

They are popular amongst Muslims, who use them to perform iʿtikāf. As in West Sumatra, "surau" can also be synonymous with musalla within the context of public facilities.

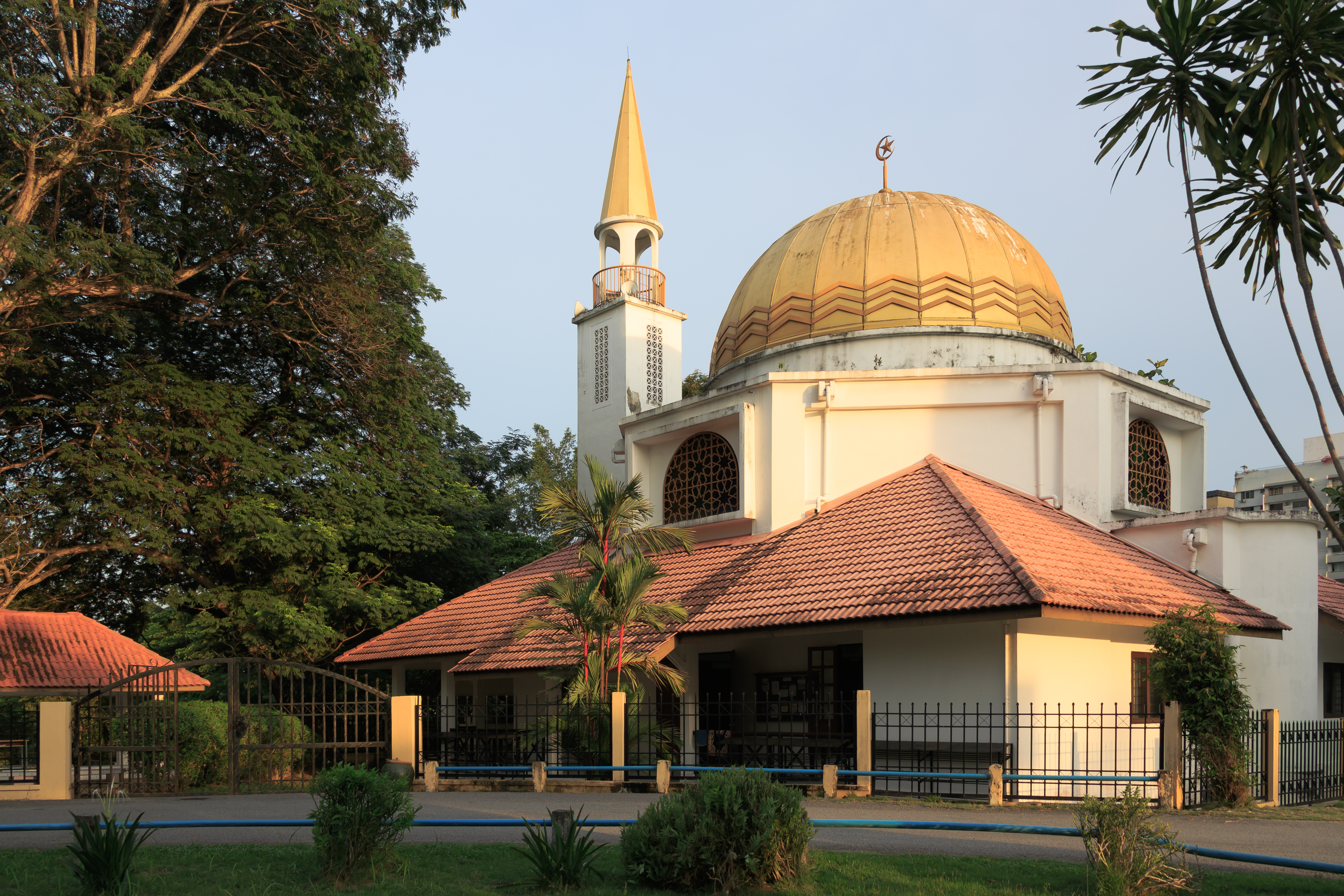
A surau in Kuala Lumpur, built in an Ottoman architectureal style

In 2024, Malaysia introduced the concept of "mobile surau", consisting of converted buses that provide increased access to prayer spaces during occasions where typical surau are not available.

=== Singapore ===
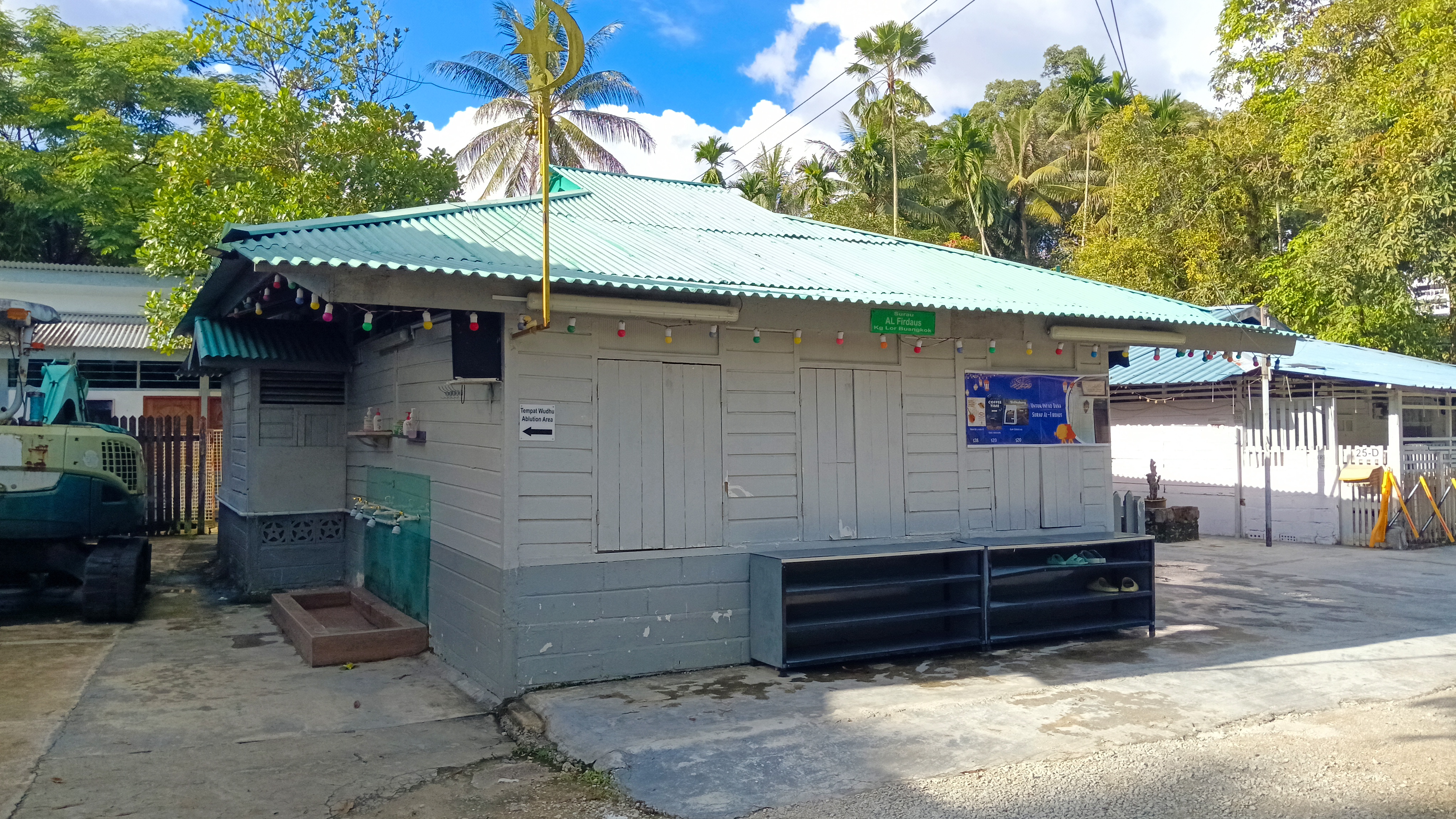
Surau Al-Firdaus, built in 1967

Surau have been present in Singapore since colonial times. Surau Al-Firdaus, located in Kampong Lorong Buangkok, the last surviving kampung in the country, remains active and is used daily. A surau is also present within the grounds of the Singapore General Hospital.

With the advance of urbanisation, surau have either been demolished or turned into mosques. The latter category includes Masjid Wak Tanjong, Masjid Kampong Delta, and Masjid Hajjah Rahimabi Kebun Limau. A ruined surau stands at the entrance of the Keramat Bukit Kasita cemetery and is now used as a residence for the volunteer caretaker. However, conversion into a mosque does not always prevent surau from being demolished, as was the case with Masjid Kampong Holland.

=== Thailand ===
Surau are common in Pattani province of Thailand, due to it being a former Malay kingdom. One such place is Surau Aur, which is built from wood and resembles a small Buddhist temple. It is considered the oldest existing Islamic institution in Thailand.

== Architectural style ==
Typical surau in West Sumatra are built in the Minangkabau style of Rumah Gadang. A common feature is their peaked, multi-tiered pyramidal roof, which are adapted from Buddhist and Hindu temples. The roofs were made of fiber or wood until the 1950s, when zinc was introduced.
