= Masjid Mujahidin =

Mosque in Queenstown, Singapore

Mujahidin Mosque
- Jawi: مسجد المجاهدين
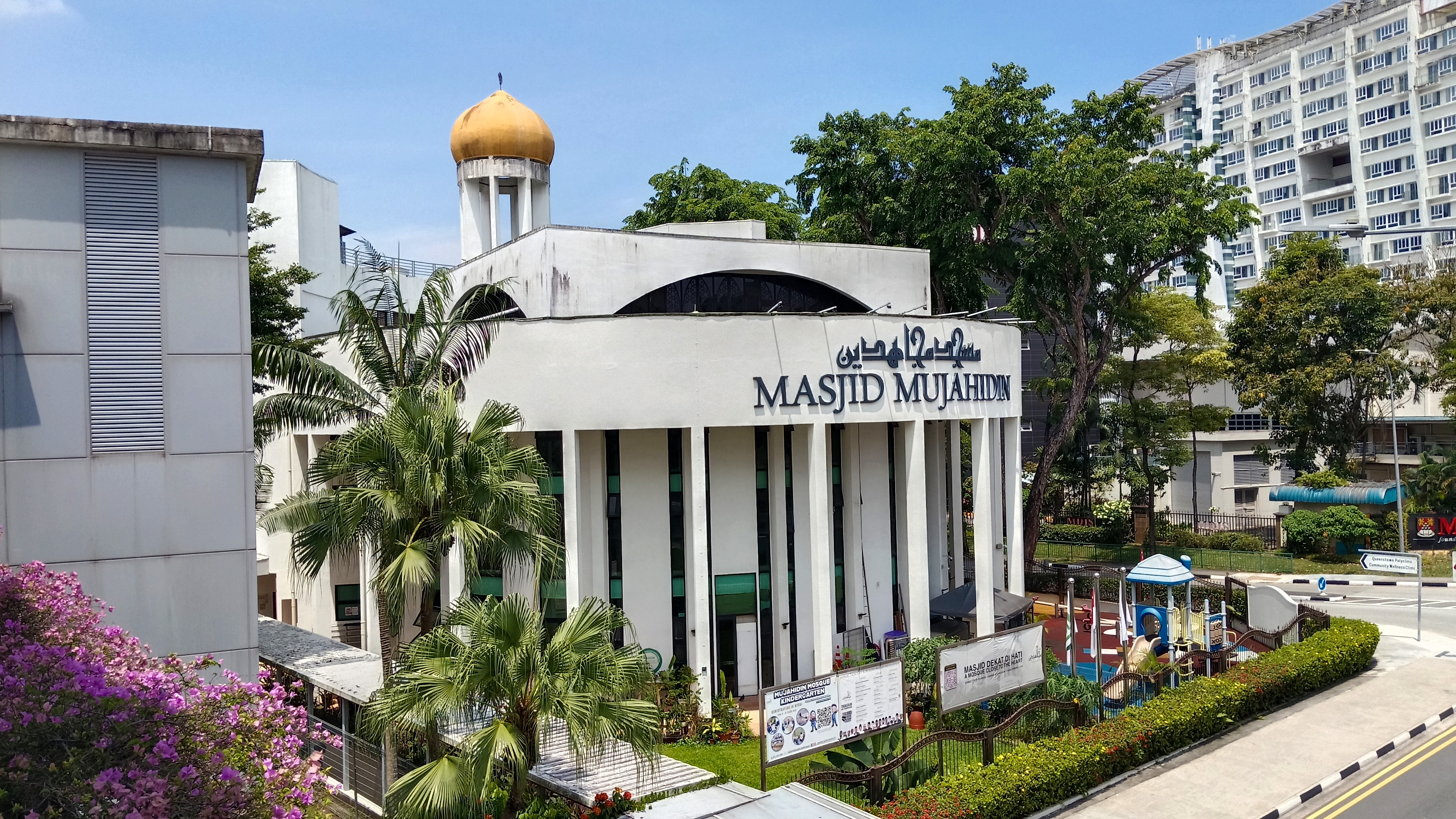

- Location in Singapore

Religion
- Affiliation: Sunni Islam

Location
- Location: 590 Stirling Rd, Singapore 148952
- Country: Singapore
- Coordinates: 1.2979685°N 103.8010483°E

Architecture
- Completed: 1977
- Capacity: 1,000–2,000

The Mujahidin Mosque or Masjid Mujahidin (Jawi: مسجد المجاهدين) is located in Queenstown, Singapore. It was completed in 1977, being the second mosque to be constructed under the Mosque Building Fund by the Majlis Ugama Islam Singapura (MUIS). The mosque has also been listed as a monument on Queenstown's main heritage trail.

== History ==
The Mujahidin Mosque was the second mosque built under the Mosque Building Fund. It was officially opened on 9 October 1977 by Ahmed Mattar, the Acting Minister for Social Affairs. The cost of construction amounted to at least $1.1 million, which was attained through donations from the public. Upon its opening, issues were reported about the direction of the qibla which were finally corrected in 1979. In 1985 plans were made for the mosque to have three stories with the construction on said plan being completed in 1993. The mosque also received an overseas donation from King Fahd of Saudi Arabia earlier in 1992.

A bus stop leading to the mosque was established in 2006. After the creation of My Queenstown Heritage Trail in 2010, the mosque was listed as a heritage site of Queenstown. The mosque was then upgraded in 2013 to fit the growing number of worshippers. In 2014, after the demolition of Masjid Kampong Holland, the mosque prepared for a transfer of new congregants to the mosque as well as held activities organized by the former administrators of Masjid Kampong Holland. Then in 2015 the mosque launched its first Qur'anic studies centre.

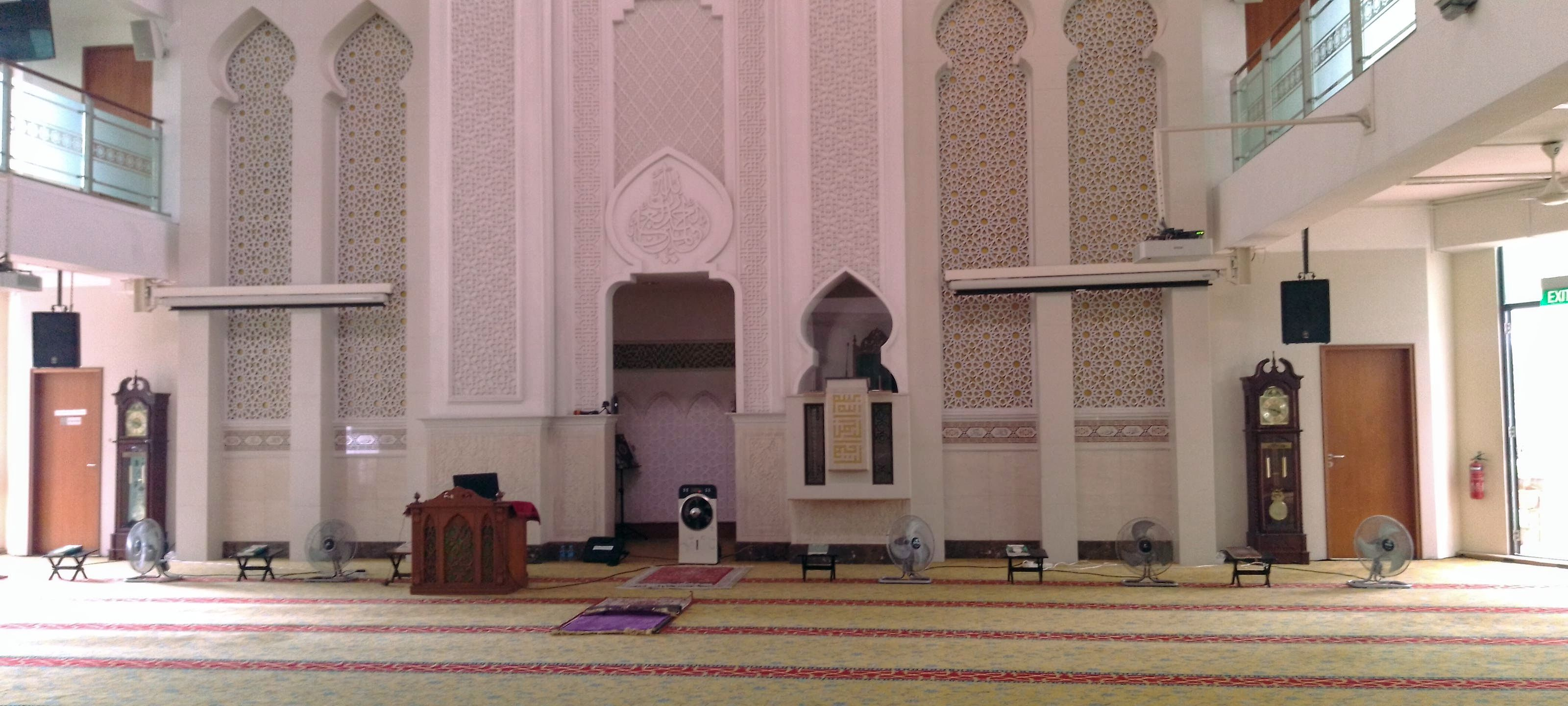
The main prayer hall of the Mujahidin Mosque.

The Mujahidin Mosque was one of the few mosques that were open for a limited congregation for the Friday prayers in 2021 during the COVID-19 pandemic.

Singer Taufik Batisah visited the mosque in 2024 with the temporary role of being the mosque's muezzin.

== Architecture ==
The Mujahidin Mosque is built in a modern architectural style and designed by Singapore's Housing and Development Board. It is a three-storey building which can fit over a thousand worshippers. The prayer hall is circular in shape with glass panelling surrounding it. Verses of the Ayat al-Kursi (Throne Verse) are inscribed on the upper parts of the front wall of the prayer hall. Within the mosque building, aside from the main prayer hall, are classrooms, offices, the Imam's headquarters as well as an auditorium hall and facilities for community bonding.

== See also ==
- Masjid Jamek Queenstown
- List of mosques in Singapore
