= Surau Al-Firdaus =

Surau in Kampong Lorong Buangkok, the last village in Singapore

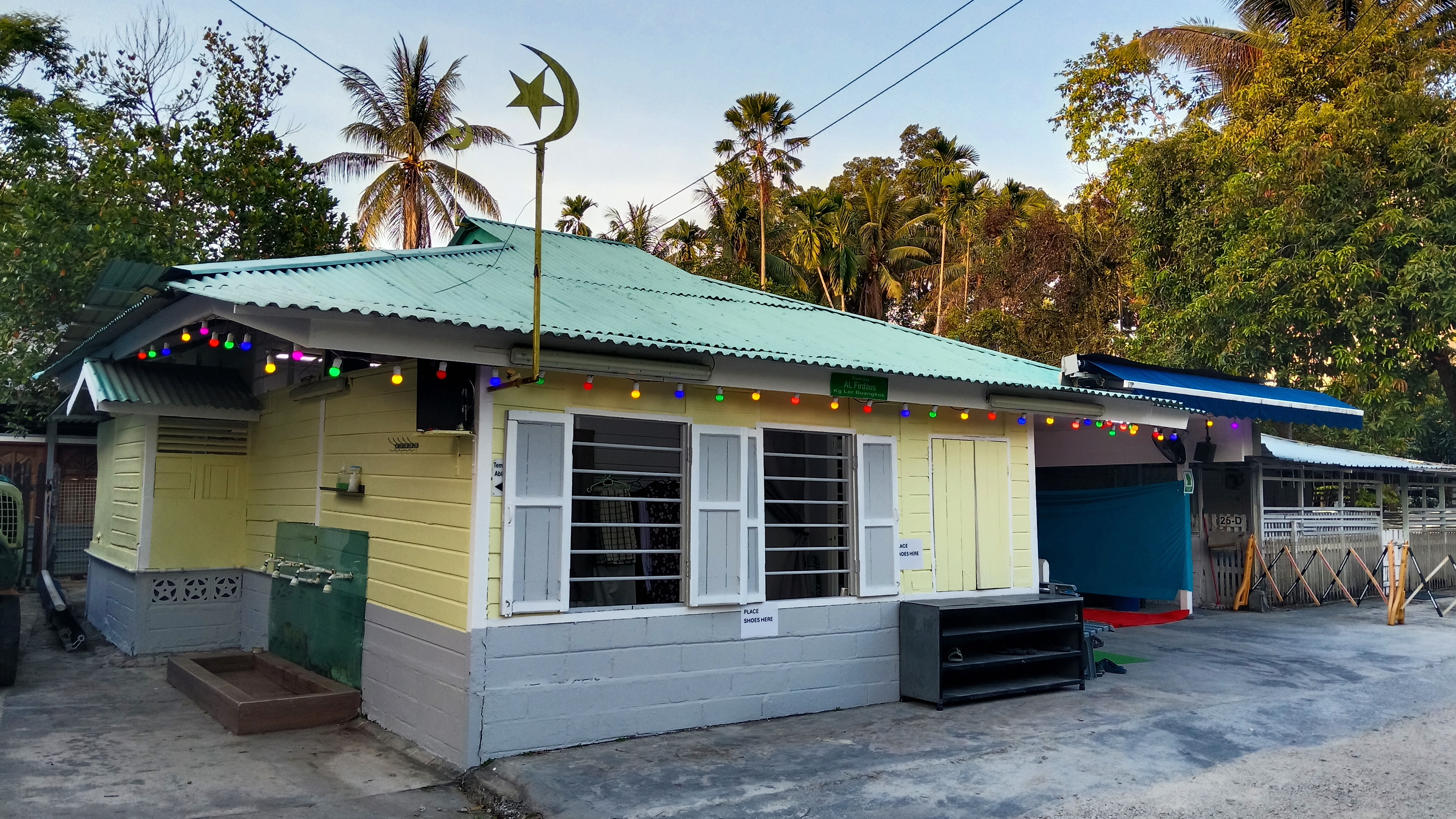
- The surau as pictured in 2026 during the Islamic month of Ramadan.

- Location within Singapore

General information
- Status: Active
- Type: Surau, Musalla
- Architectural style: Malay architecture
- Classification: Islamic place for prayers
- Location: 23E Lorong Buangkok, Singapore 547578, Hougang, Singapore
- Coordinates: 1.384096°N 103.878673°E

Surau Al-Firdaus is a surau located in Kampong Lorong Buangkok, the last surviving village in Singapore. It was originally built in 1953 to serve the Muslim villagers of Kampong Lorong Buangkok. Rebuilt twice in 1967 then 1999, the surau can accommodate up to 80 worshippers during both daily and festive prayers.

== Background ==
A surau is a house of assembly, with typical functions similar to a mosque, but is smaller than one. The concept of surau originated in Minangkabau, originally as a small temple for ancestor worship and fraternities, until the introduction of Islam when the purpose of a surau was changed into a place for Muslims to pray their five daily prayers. The major difference between a mosque and a surau is that a mosque comes under an awqaf (permanent endowment), unlike a surau. In modern times, especially in Singapore, most suraus have been converted into full-fledged mosques, a notable example being Masjid Hang Jebat.

== History ==
The original surau was built in 1953. With the help of donations gathered in the 1960s, the surau was rebuilt in 1967. Starting in 1981, the surau became a place for festive prayers, including the prayers on the Islamic festival of Eid al-Adha. The surau was later rebuilt in 1999 to accommodate more worshippers. By 2004, the surau had become a popular destination for worship by both the villagers and Singaporeans who lived in modern housing estates.

In 2018, Surau Al-Firdaus was extensively renovated, giving the surau a new exterior facade and as well as a larger prayer hall with a capacity increased to 80 worshippers. During the COVID-19 pandemic, all mosques nationwide were closed down, while Surau Al-Firdaus still remained opened for worshippers to perform their daily prayers as well as Tarawih. The surau was later listed as a visitable heritage site during a Malay heritage tour in December 2020 and hosted a Jawi calligraphy workshop where participants could create their own Jawi calligraphic art pieces.

== Architecture ==
Surau Al-Firdaus is built in a style that is uniform to the other houses in the village. It has a slanted zinc roof that is specifically shaped to prevent rainwater from building up. The present building is made of concrete and it can accommodate up to 80 worshippers especially during festive prayers.

== Gallery ==
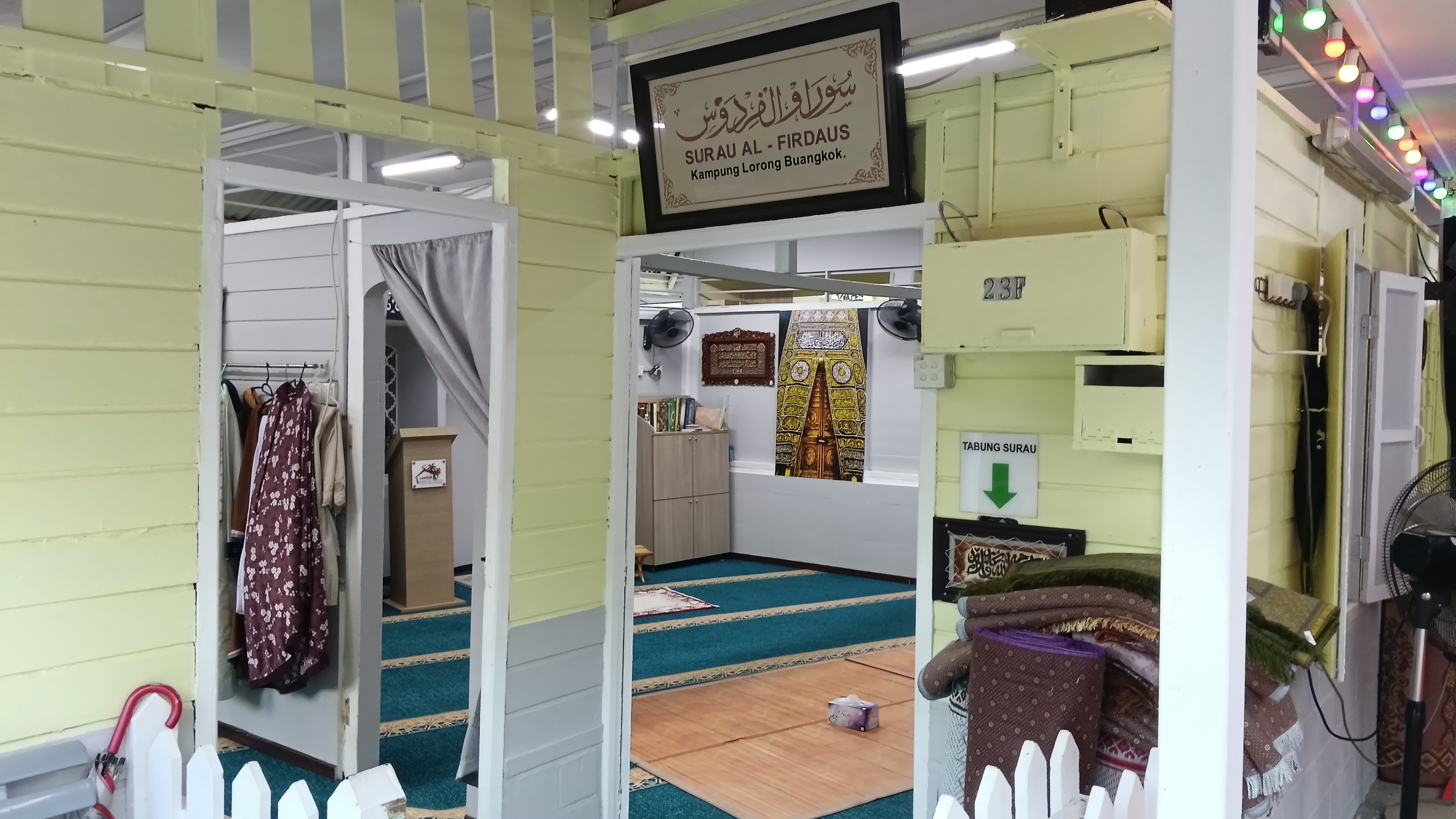
The main entrance to the surau.

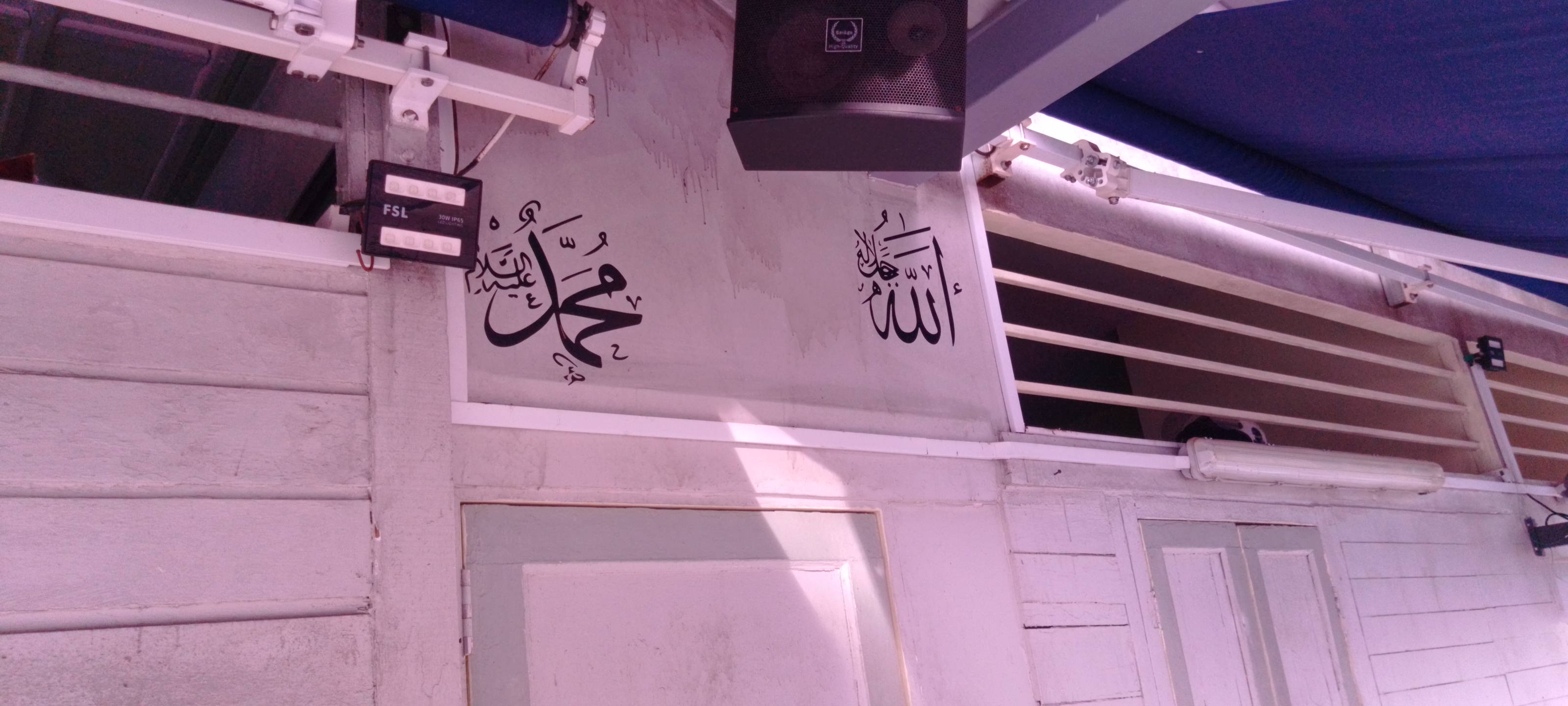
Arabic calligraphies can be seen at the rear exit of the surau.

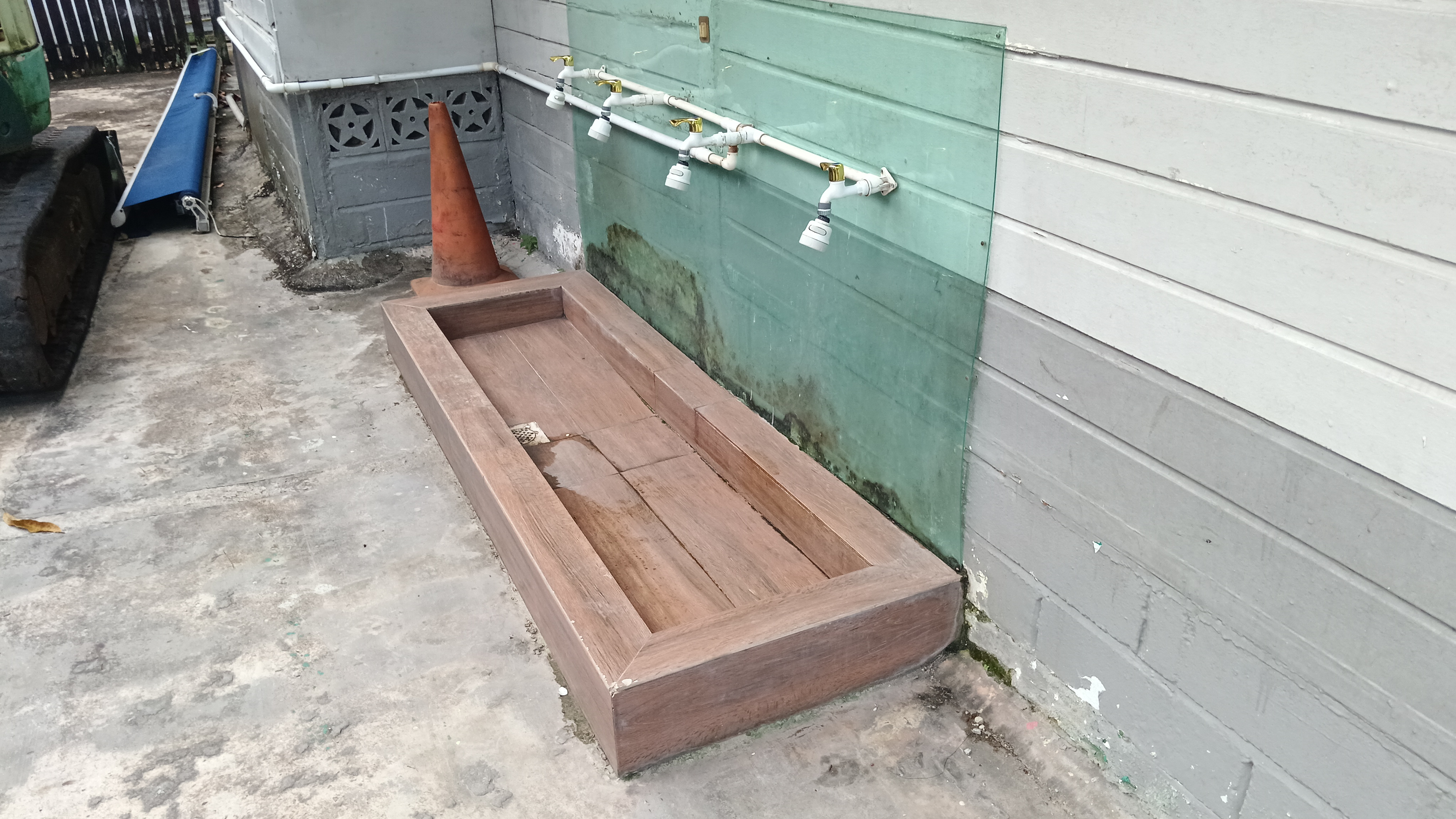
The area for worshippers to take their ablution before prayers.

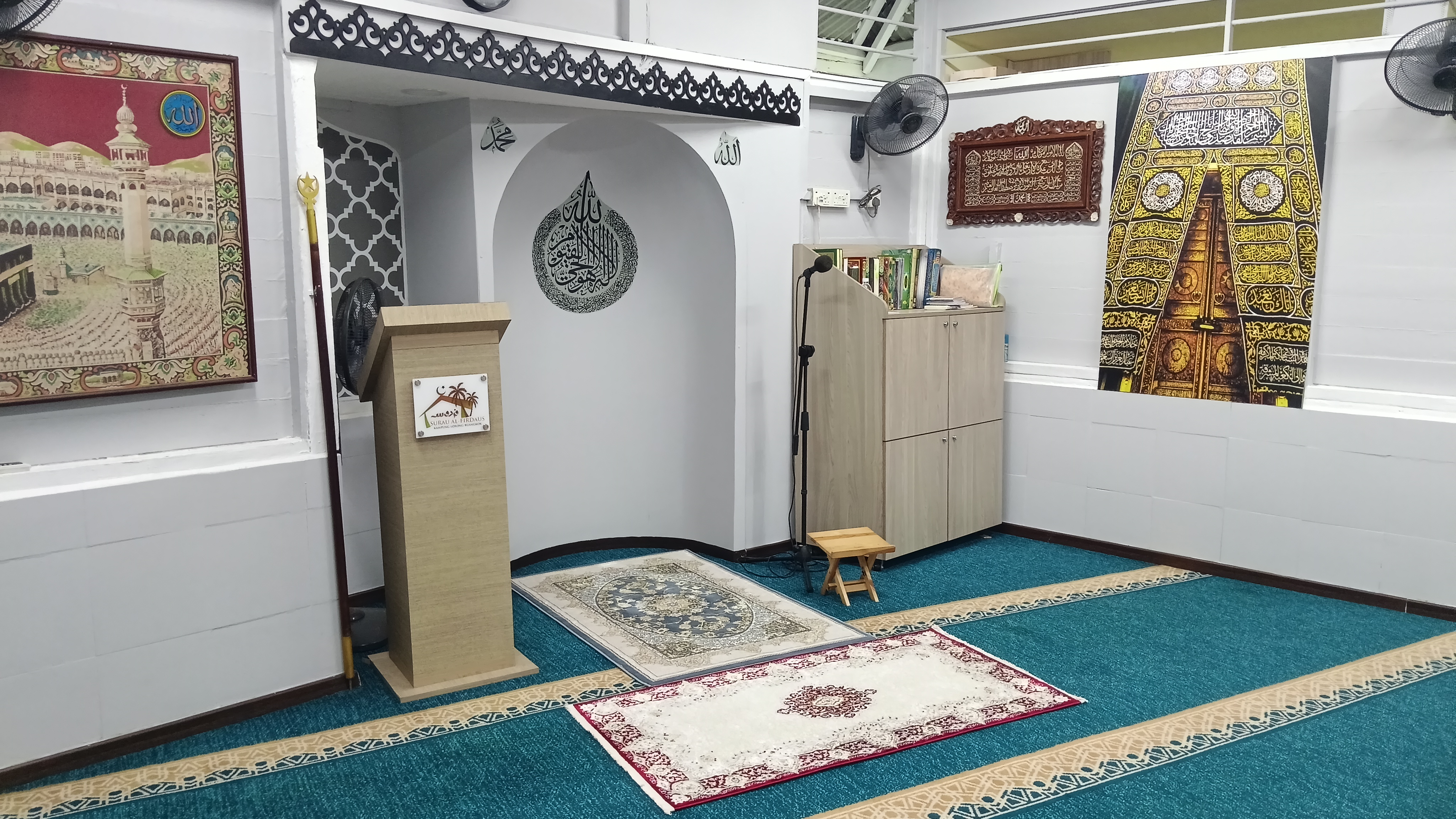
The interior of the surau, with mihrab visible.

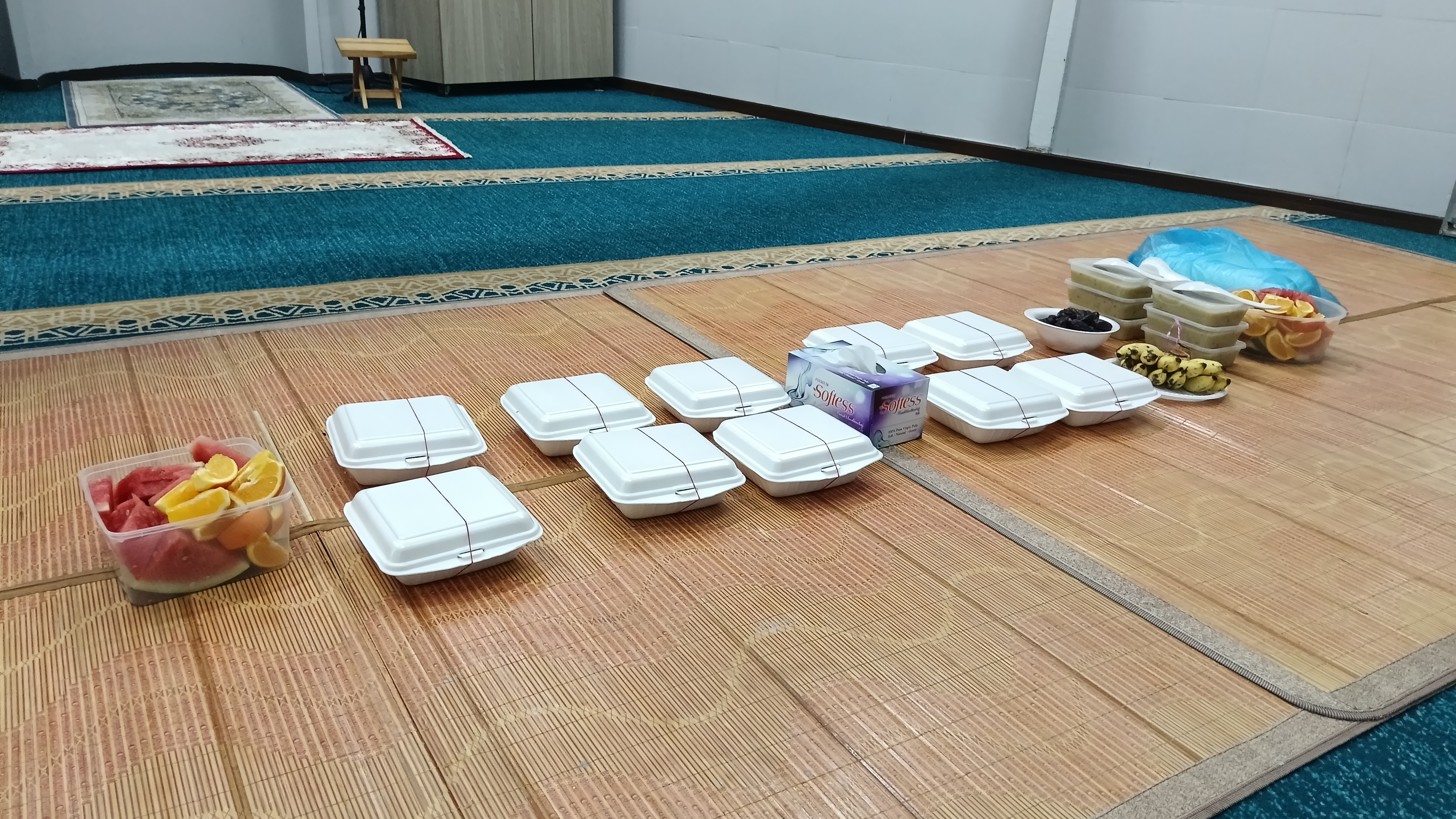
Meals packed for Iftar at the surau.

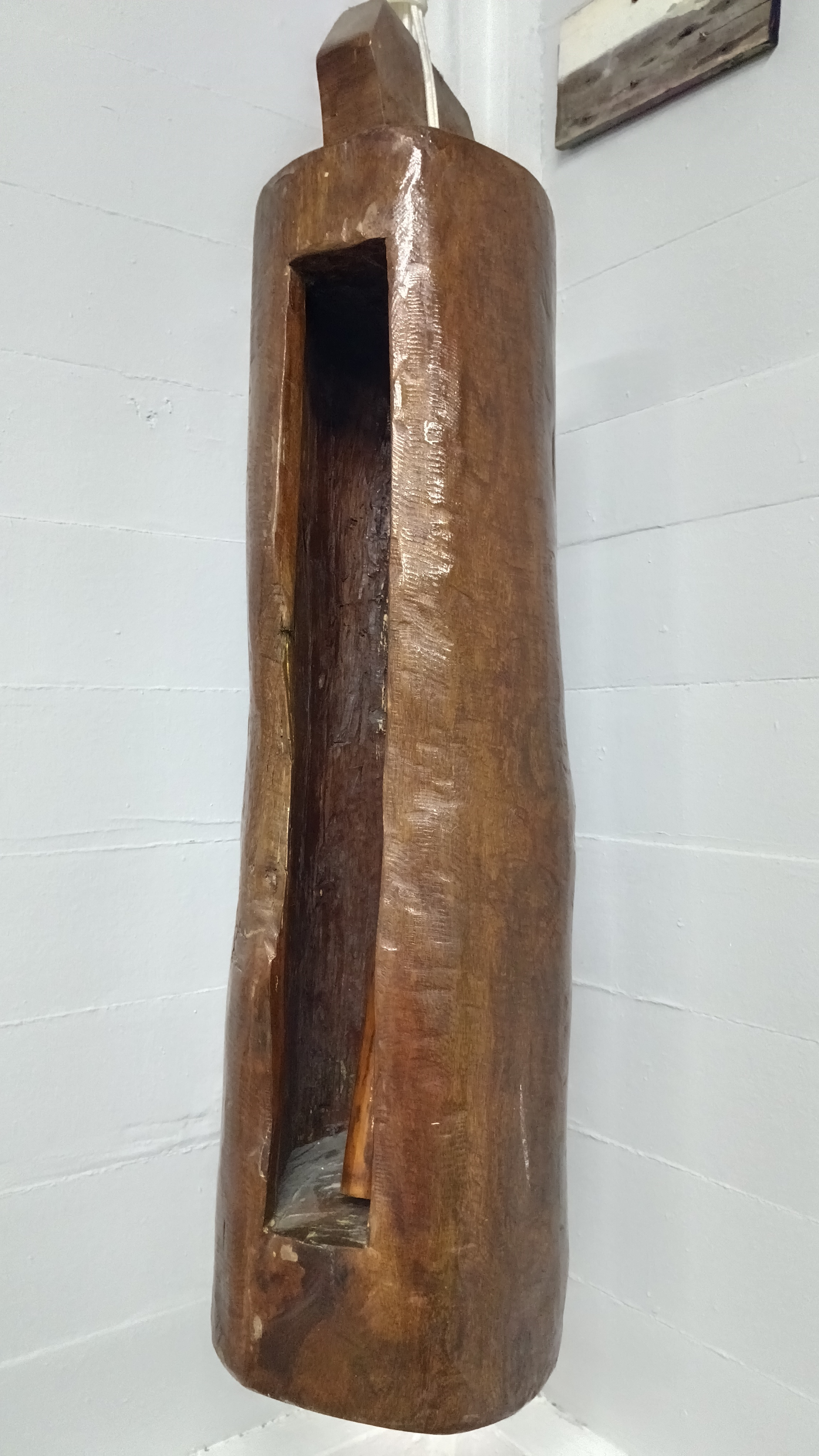
The kentong (slit drum) that was formerly used to call villagers to prayer.

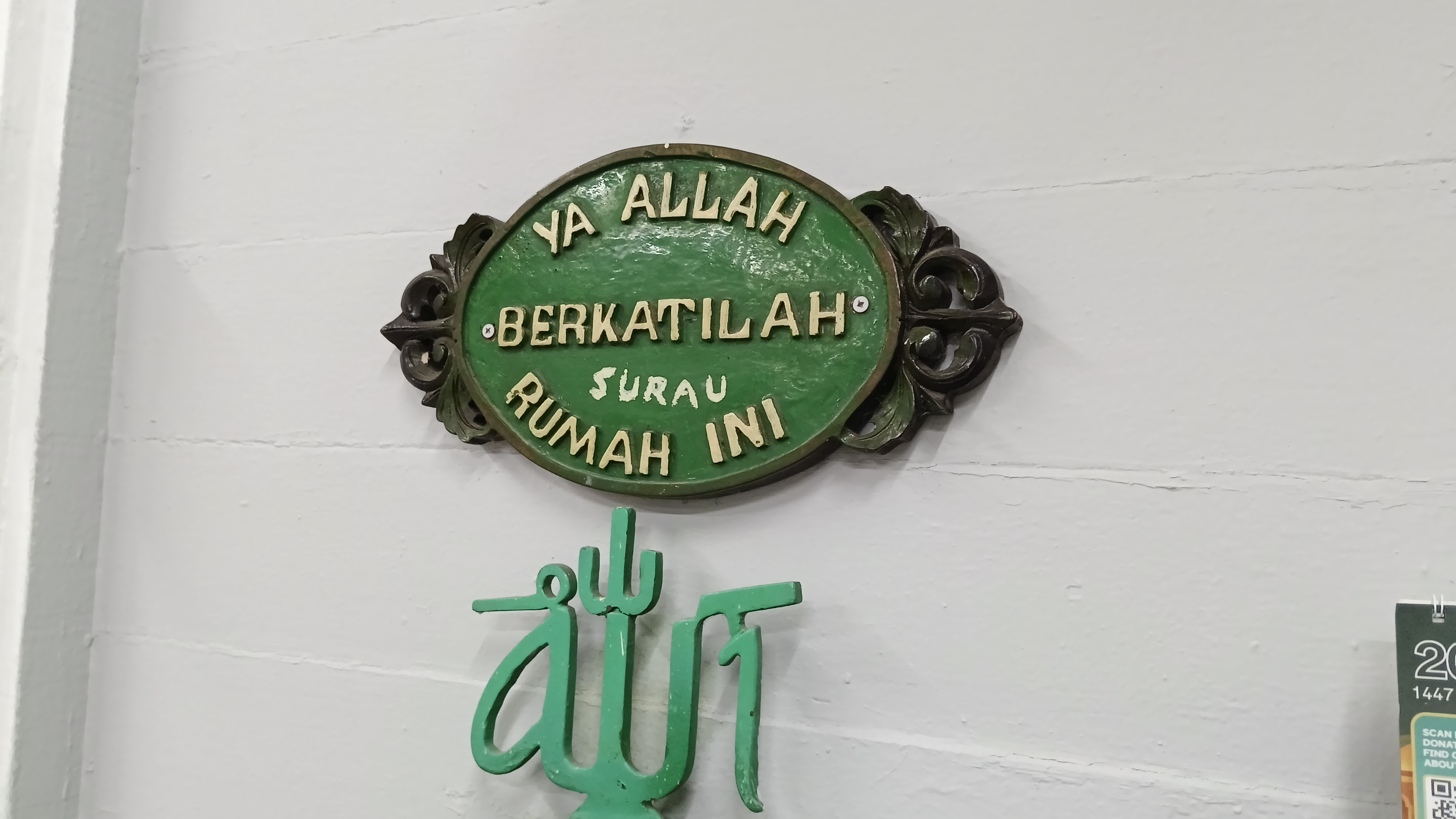
A decorative painted ornament inside the surau.

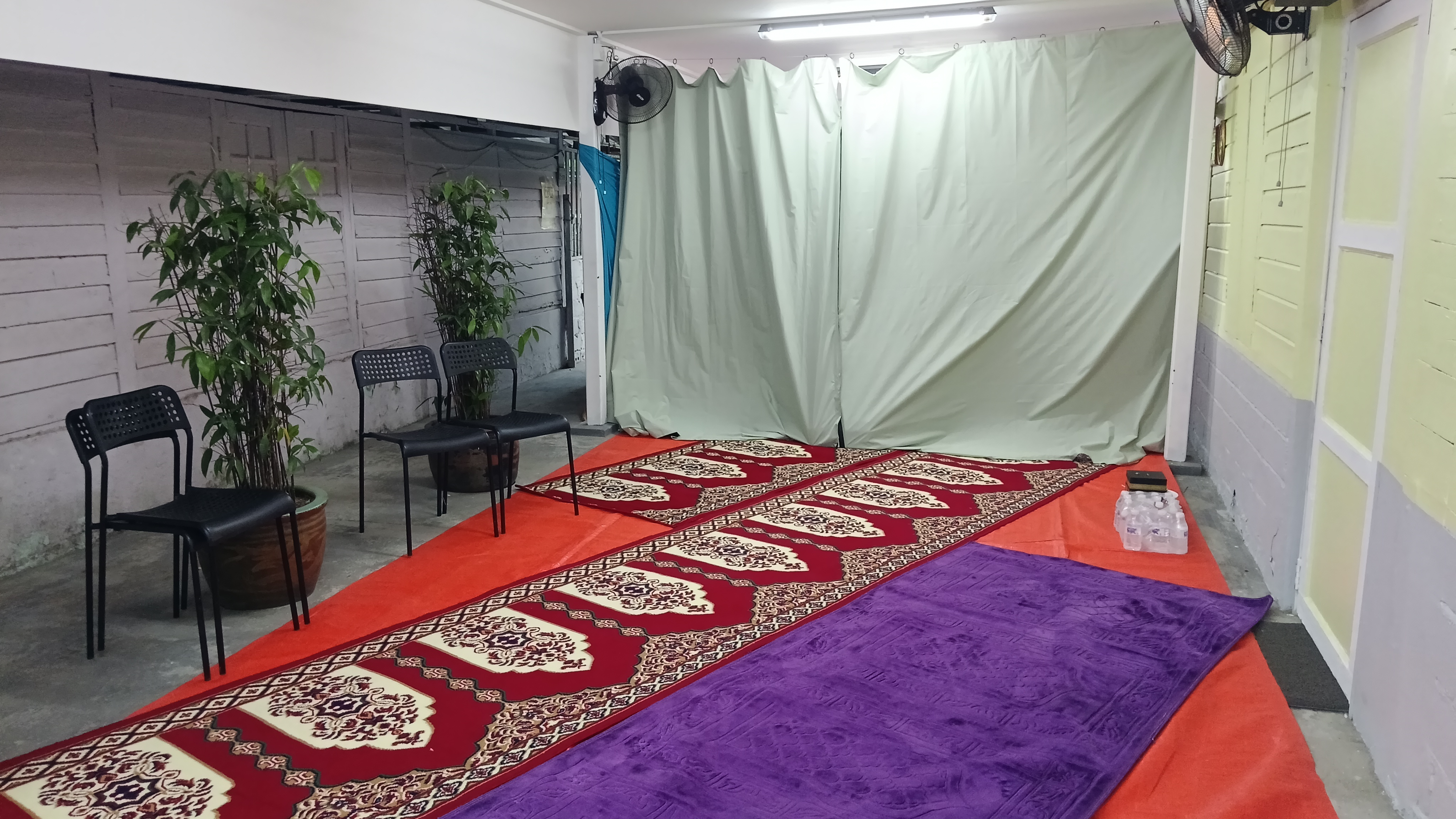
A space for worshippers to catch up with the tarawih prayers when the surau is full.

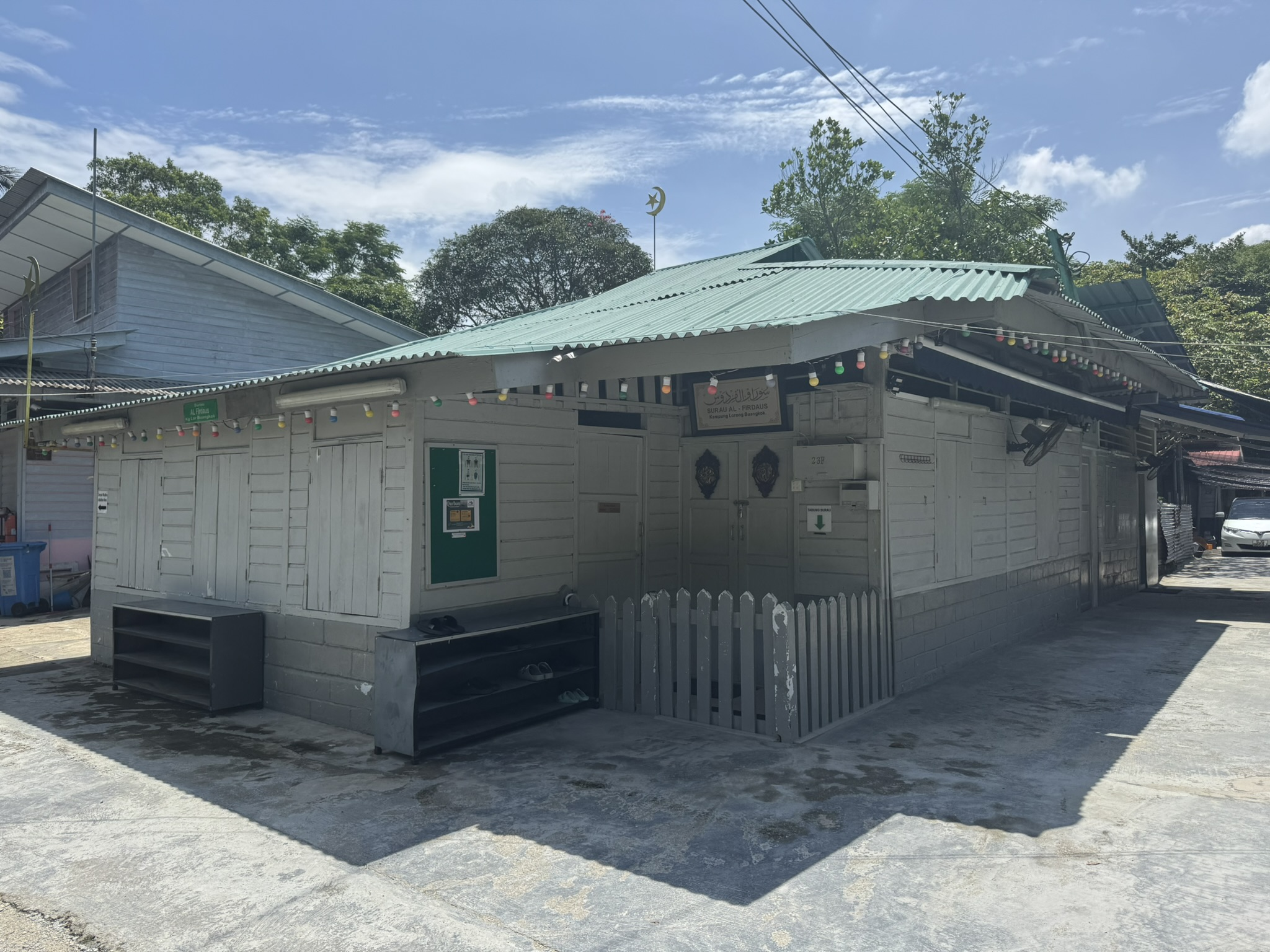
The surau in an older colour scheme.

== Transportation ==
Surau Al-Firdaus is located in the Kampong Lorong Buangkok village which can be accessed by bus service 114 from the Buangkok Bus Interchange.

== See also ==
- Islam in Singapore
- List of mosques in Singapore
