= Kampong Lorong Buangkok =

Village in Singapore

Coordinates: 1°23′0″N 103°52′41″E

Kampong Lorong Buangkok Malay: كامڤوڠ لوروڠ بواڠكوق Chinese: 甘榜罗弄万国
- Village
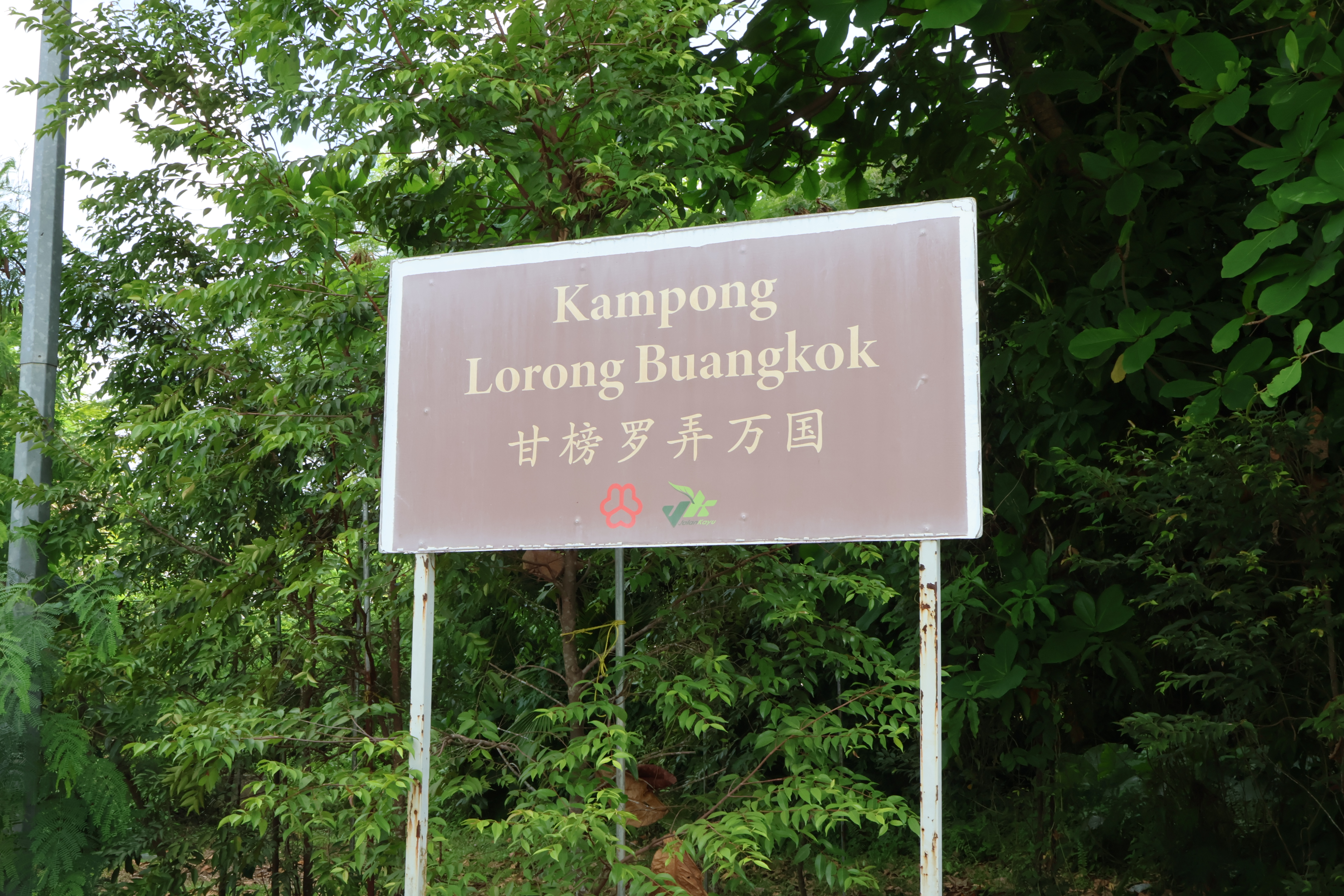
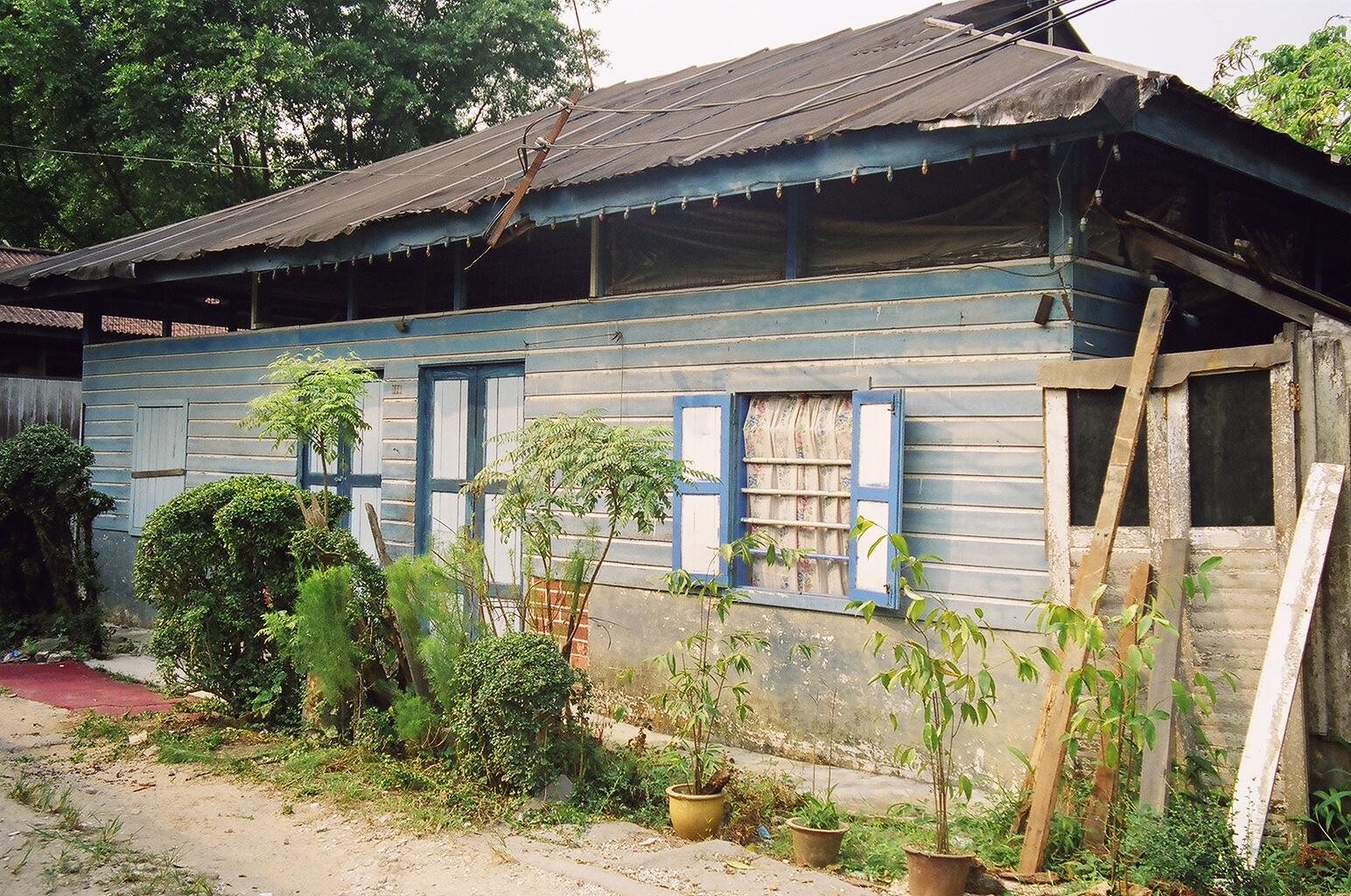
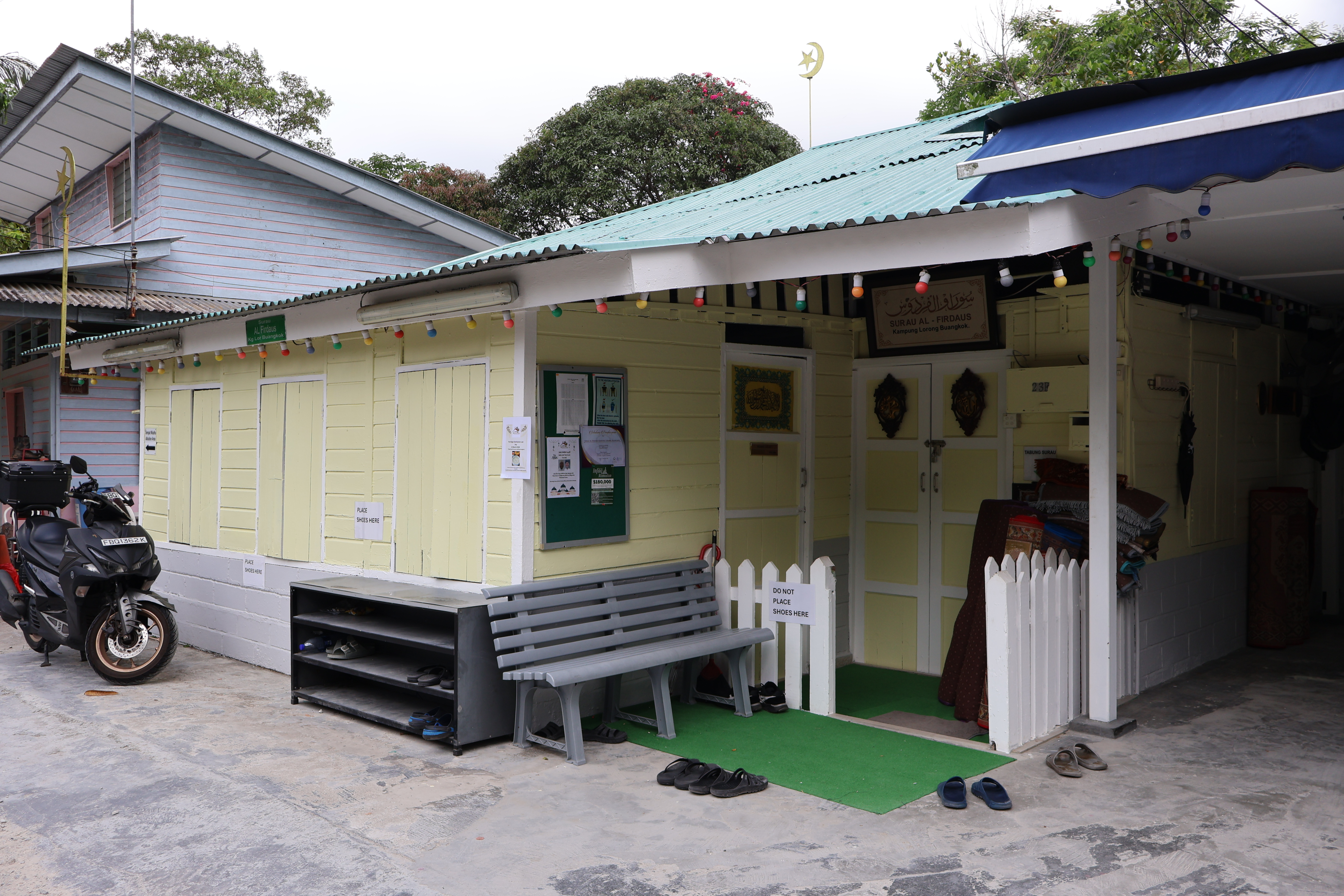
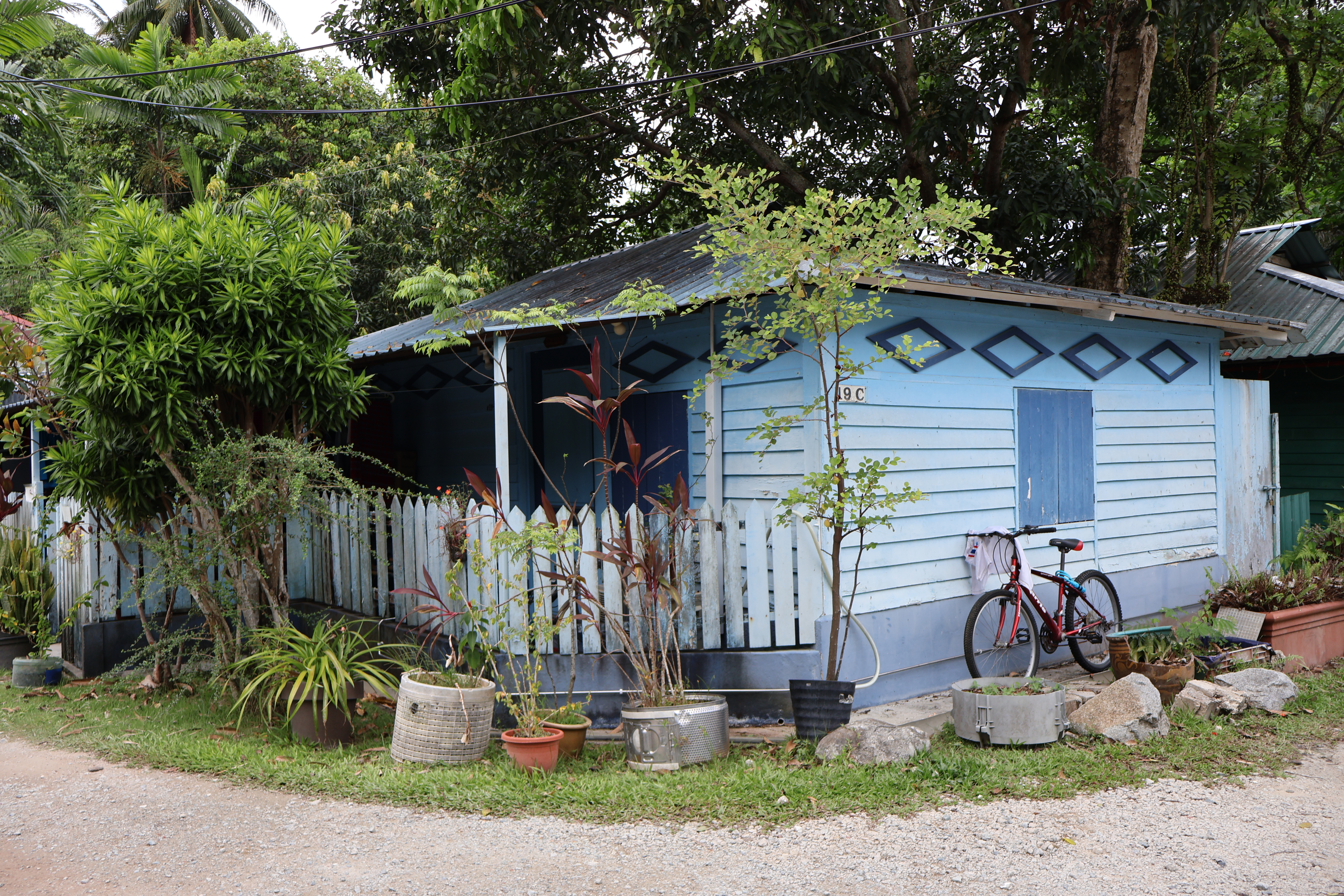
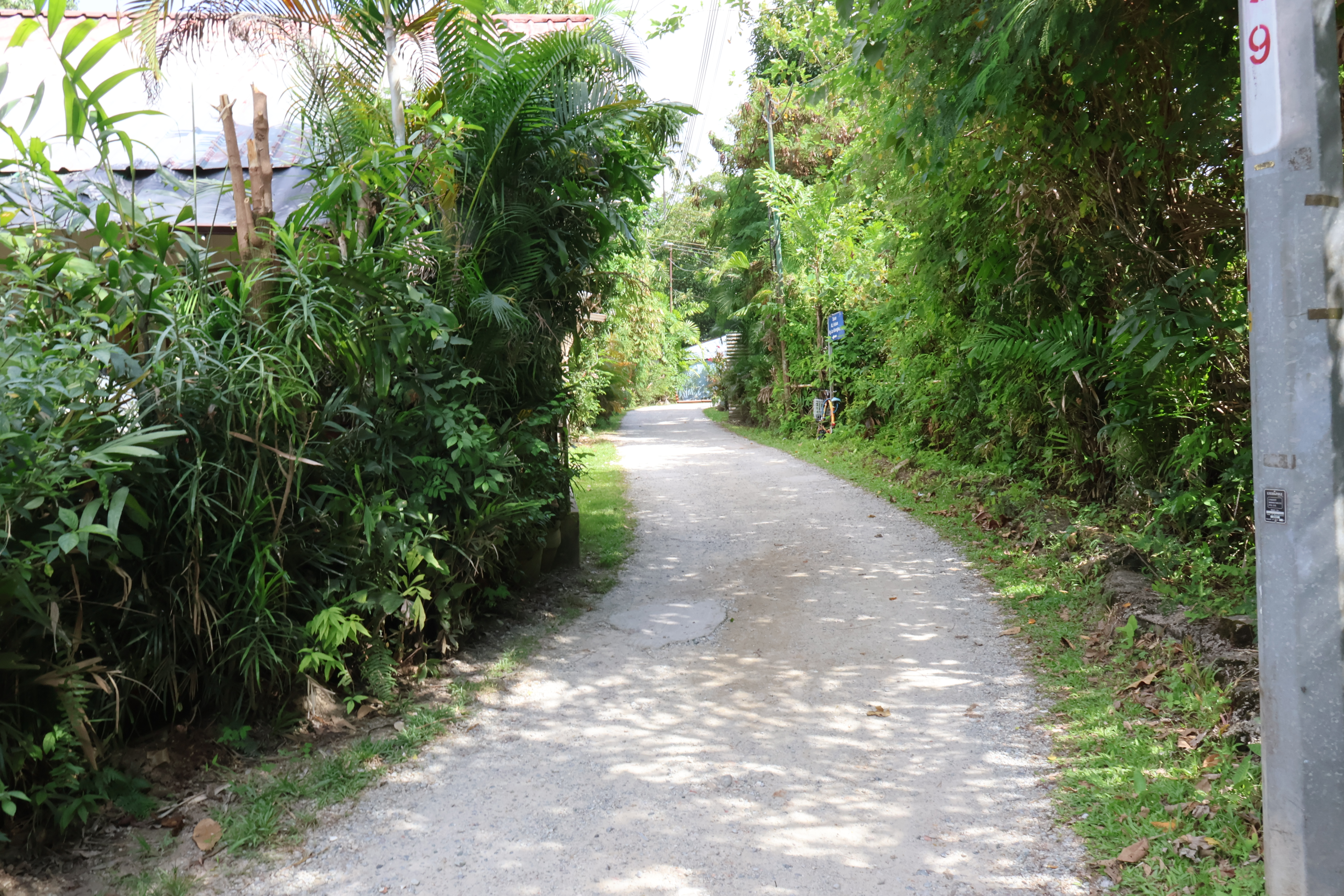
- From top; left to right: Entrance sign to the kampong, A village house, The Surau Al-Firdaus, A blue village house, A footpath inside the kampong
- Interactive map of Kampong Lorong Buangkok
- Country: Singapore
- Planning area: Hougang

Area
  - Total: 0.31 km^{2} (0.12 sq mi)

Kampong Lorong Buangkok (Note: Kampung Selak Kain; Jawi: كامڤوڠ لوروڠ بواڠكوق; Chinese: 甘榜罗弄万国; pinyin: Gānbǎng Luónòng Wànguó) is a village located in Hougang, Singapore. Built in 1956, it is notable for being the last surviving kampong located in mainland Singapore. It is situated right beside a canal that drains into the nearby Sungei Punggol.

== History ==
The kampong was also known as Selak Kain in Malay, which meant 'hitching up one's sarong (skirt)' as people hitch up their sarongs to wade through floods whenever the village experienced flash floods in the 20th century Singapore. The land which the kampong rests on, was acquired in 1956 from Mr Huang Yu Tu by Sng Teow Koon, a traditional Chinese medicine (TCM) seller and herbalist.

At the point of purchase, there were already 4 to 6 houses built on the land. He set up home in the village with his family, and started renting out land to people to build homes. The land was handed down to his children. It evolved into a kampong. It was initially a swampy piece of land with only 5 to 6 homes. By the 1960s, it housed about 40 Chinese and Malay families. Electricity, running water, and garbage collection are provided by the government. Post is provided by a postman on a motorcycle once a day.

=== Residents ===
In the 1960s, most residents of Kampong Lorong Buangkok worked in the nearby Woodbridge Hospital or factories, while their children studied in nearby schools. A small rental fee of $2–$3 was paid by the residents back then. They also tended to rear their own chickens for food.

In the present day, the residents consist of make-up artists, workers, and mostly elderly residents. As of 2024, the kampong housed 25 families (12 Chinese and 13 Malay). Paying an average of S$18.25 in rent, they continue to live a slower and more traditional pace of life that the kampong setting offers. The Muslim residents have the Surau Al-Firdaus, a small prayer house that functions as a mosque. However, it is also used by Muslims from the urban areas outside Kampong Lorong Buangkok as well.

== In popular culture ==
In 2009, the area was featured in a The New York Times article headlined "Singapore prepares to gobble up its last village," which covered how the kampong was due to be demolished and redeveloped into two schools (primary and secondary), and also a road linking Buangkok Drive and Yio Chu Kang Road, as planned according to the 2008 Urban Redevelopment Authority (URA) Masterplan. Plans for building of two schools and the road were however dropped. In 2017, then-Second Minister for National Development Desmond Lee said that any redevelopment of the area would only occur "several decades later".

== Gallery ==
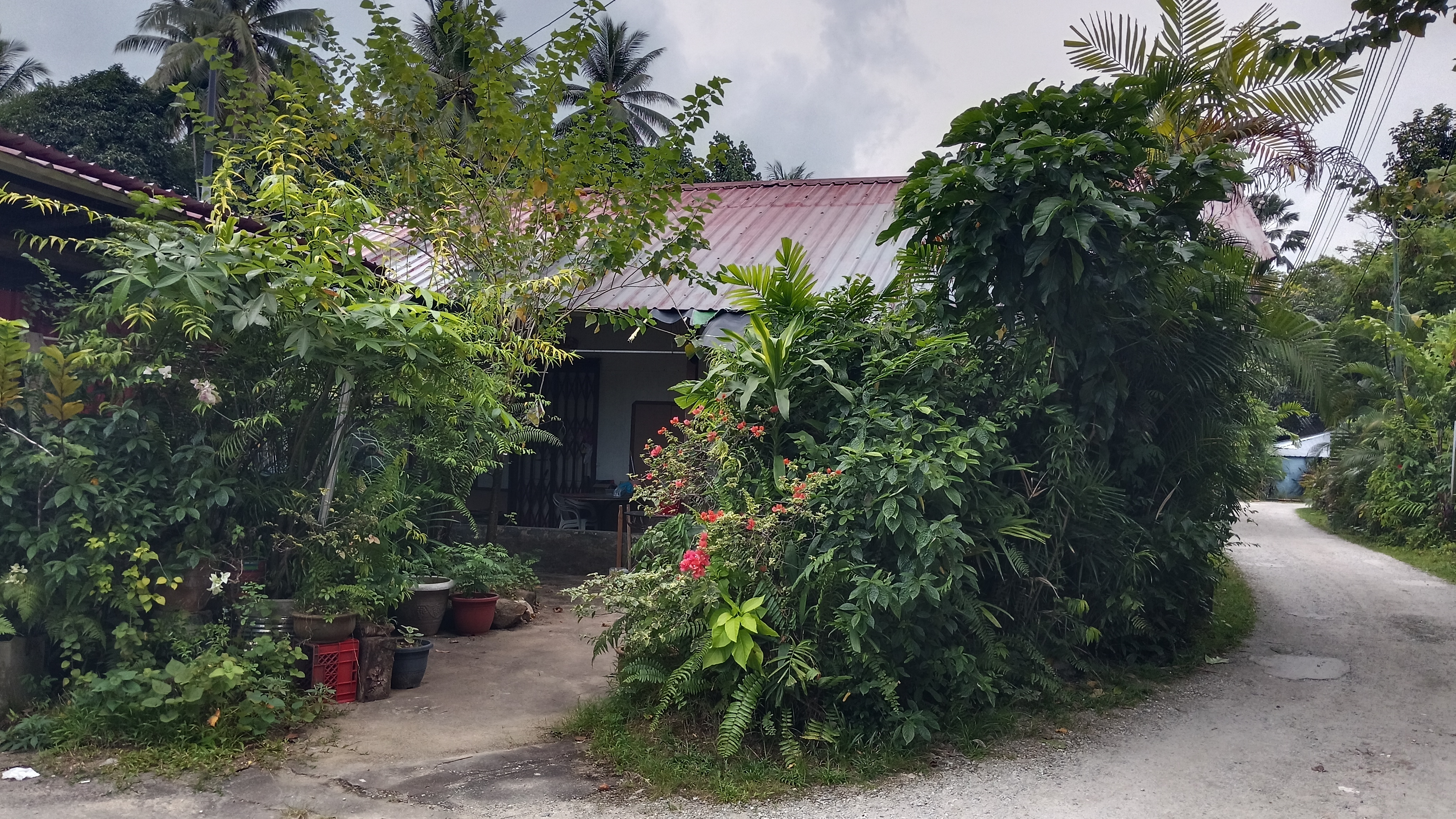
A rusty house at the entrance of the village.

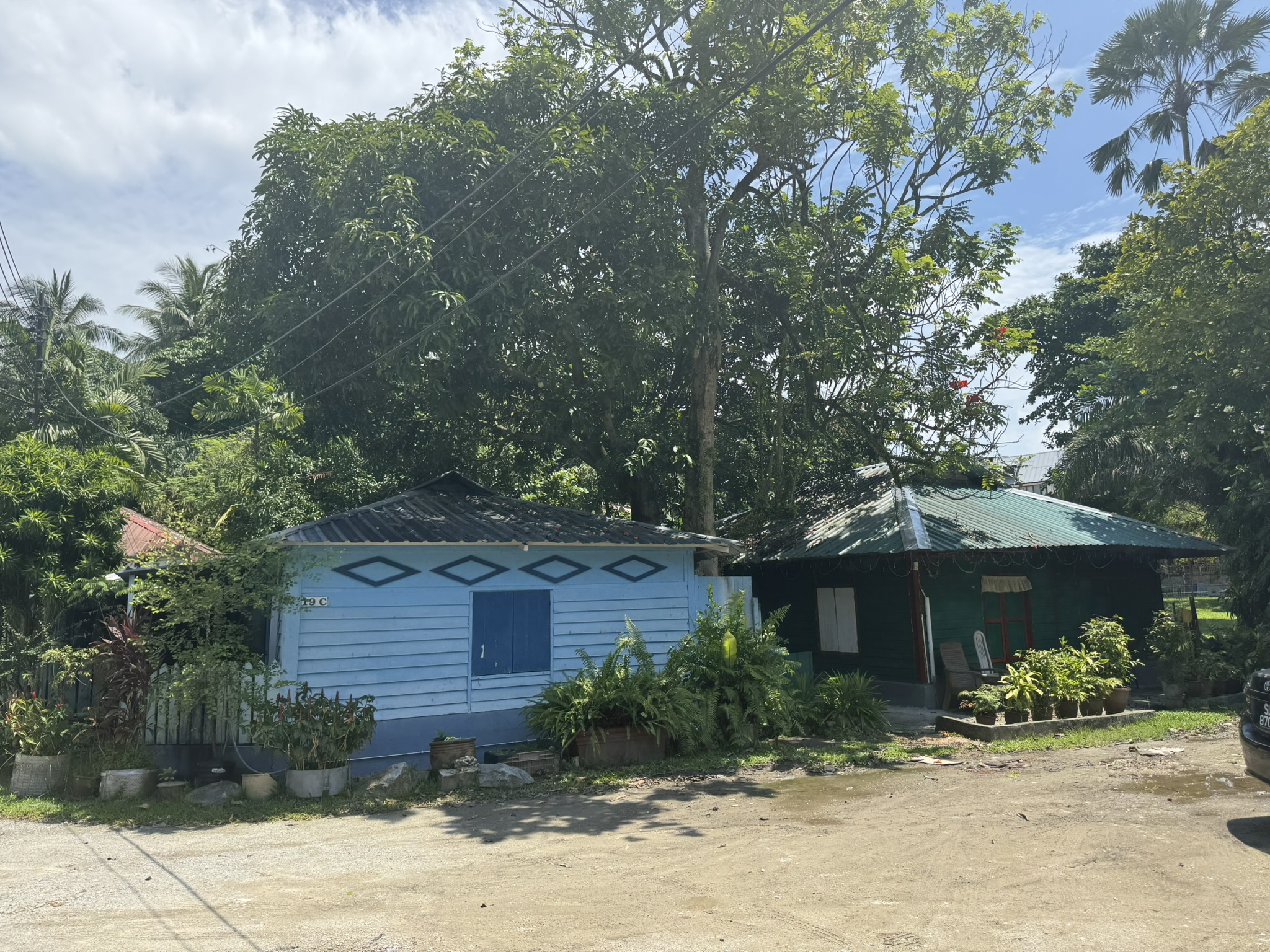
A pair of identical houses in the village with different colours.

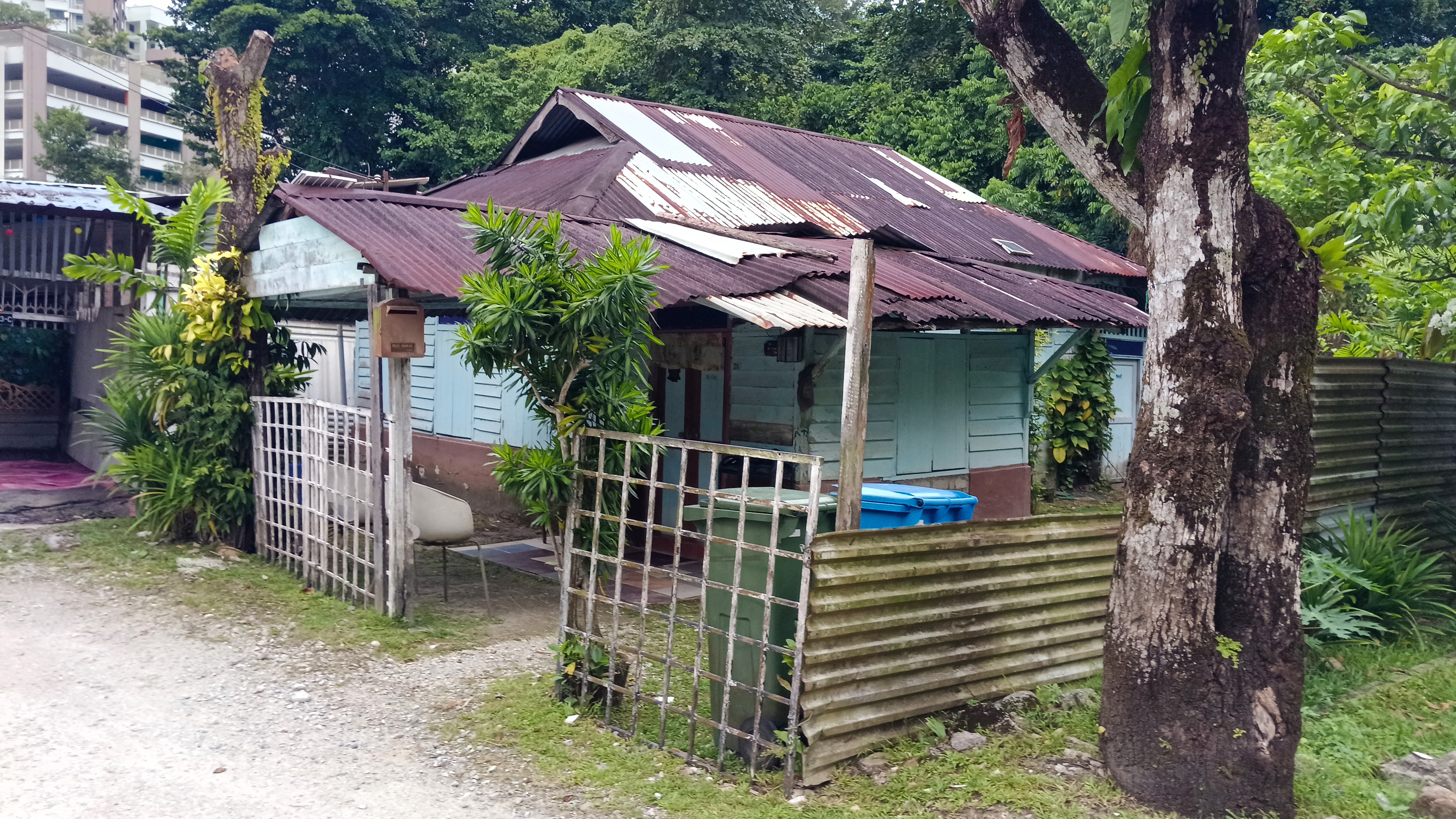
A house with a rusted zinc roof.

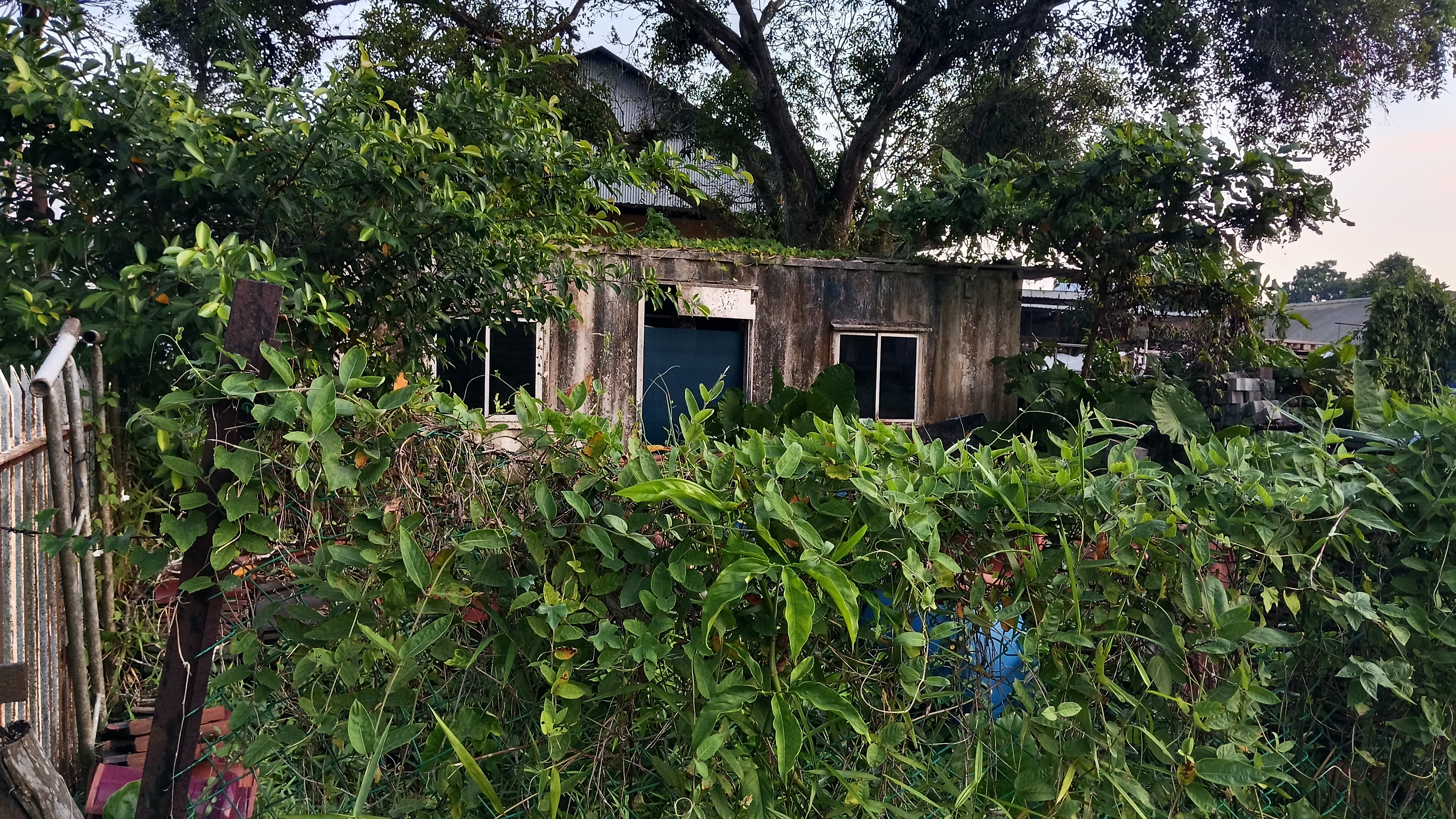
A wooden shed.

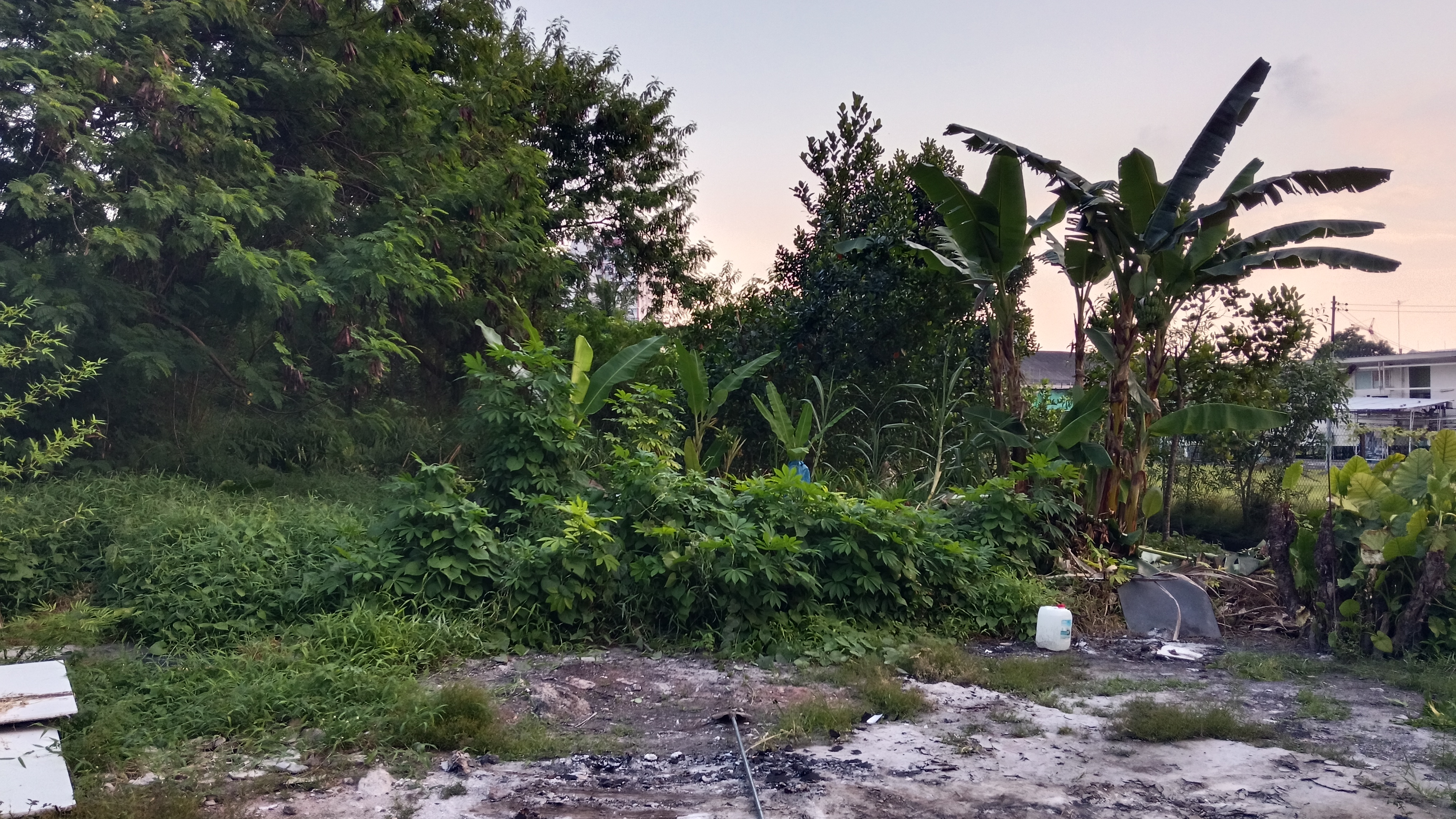
A plantation.
