= SERS =

SERS can mean:

- South Ethiopia Regional State, Region in Southern Ethiopia.
- Selective En bloc Redevelopment Scheme, a housing strategy in Singapore.
- Surface enhanced Raman spectroscopy or surface-enhanced Raman scattering

== See also ==
- Sers (disambiguation)
