= Murder of Ahora Murthi Krishnasamy =

1973 murder of a mediator in Singapore

Ahora Murthi Krishnasamy
- Born: Ahora Murthi s/o Krishnasamy c. 1949; Colony of Singapore
- Died: 21 December 1973 (aged 24); Kampong Kapor, Singapore
- Cause of death: Fatal stab wounds to the heart and lung
- Occupation: Crane driver
- Known for: Murder victim

On 21 December 1973, nearby a Kampong Kapor community centre, 24-year-old crane driver Ahora Murthi Krishnasamy was stabbed to death by a Malaysian labourer after he sought to resolve a previous dispute between the killer and Murthi's friend. The murderer, K. Vijayan Krishnan, was arrested and charged with murder. Vijayan put up a defence that he was gravely provoked into using a chopper to inflict 11 stab wounds on Murthi, causing Murthi's death. However, the defence was rejected on the grounds that Vijayan had intentionally killed Murthi and was not provoked into killing Murthi, and Vijayan was found guilty of murdering Murthi and sentenced to death in November 1974. Vijayan's execution was carried out on 30 April 1976, after the higher courts rejected Vijayan's appeals and confirmed his death sentence.

== Fatal stabbing ==
On the night of 21 December 1973, a young man was stabbed to death outside a Kampong Kapor community centre, and a youth was arrested for the stabbing, which was classified as murder. The motive for the stabbing was not known at that point of time, and police investigations were conducted to find out the reason behind the killing.

The victim was identified as 24-year-old Ahora Murthi Krishnasamy, who worked as a crane driver at the time of his death. Professor Chao Tzee Cheng, a senior forensic pathologist, conducted an autopsy on the victim, and he found that Murthi sustained a total of 11 stab wounds on his body, and one of them penetrated the heart while another had cut through the right lung; both these injuries were sufficient in the ordinary course of nature to cause death.

On 23 December 1973, the suspect, a 21-year-old Malaysian whose name was K. Vijayan Krishnan, was charged with murder under the name "Sukumaran Krishnan". Prior to the murder, Vijayan came from the Malaysian state of Johor, and he worked as a labourer. He was later remanded at the Central Police Division for further investigations after his indictment in court.

== Murder trial ==
K. Vijayan Krishnan
- Born: K. Vijayan s/o Krishnan c. 1952; Johor, Malaysia
- Died: 30 April 1976 (aged 24); Changi Prison, Singapore
- Cause of death: Execution by hanging
- Other name: Sukumaran Krishnan
- Occupation: Labourer (former)
- Status: Executed
- Motive: Alleged provocation
- Conviction: Murder (one count)
- Criminal charges: Murder (one count)
- Penalty: Death

On 11 November 1974, K. Vijayan Krishnan officially stood trial at the High Court for the murder of Ahora Murthi Krishnasamy. Defence lawyer Ng Kong Yeam represented Vijayan, while Deputy Public Prosecutor (DPP) Lawrence Ang led the prosecution, and the trial was presided over by two judges - Justice T Kulasekaram and Justice A V Winslow.

The trial court was told that one night in December, just days prior to the murder, there was a dispute between two roommates living at a Serangoon rental flat, caused by the two men kicking each other while sleeping. It evolved into an argument, and Vijayan, who knew one of the roommates, had made threats against the other party and his friends. A man named Mutayan, who was threatened by Vijayan, decided to seek the help of Murthi to help bury the hatchet between the parties involved in the dispute. Subramaniam Gopal, Murthi's friend who was present with him at the time of the murder, testified that he and Murthi went together to the house in Kampong Kapor to look for Vijayan, hoping to resolve the matter, and he added that Murthi was intoxicated by alcohol when he made the request. Upon the duo's arrival at Vijayan's house, Murthi and Vijayan shook hands after they came to an agreement to resolve the matter. However, based on the facts brought forward, Murthi began to shout repeatedly while in a drunken state, and he allegedly said, "Who has given houses to Malaysians?" when he asked who Vijayan's girlfriend was, and he also challenged him to a fight. According to the witnesses present at the scene, Vijayan went to grab a meat chopper from his house and he attacked Murthi, and gave chase after Murthi. By the time they reached Kampong Kapor community centre, Vijayan had stabbed Murthi 11 times, causing Murthi's death. Vijayan was arrested on the scene for the murder, and many witnesses identified him as the perpetrator.

During Subramaniam's time on the stand, the defence subjected him to a severe cross-examination and brought forward their contention that Murthi had, in fact, attacked Vijayan with a chopper and Vijayan acted in self-defence by disarming Murthi and used the chopper to kill him, which was denied by Subramaniam. The defence also suggested to Subramaniam that Murthi had assaulted and continually abused Vijayan, and Subramaniam had taken part in the assault, and these were likewise denied by Subramaniam. The prosecution later re-examined Subramaniam, who stated that Murthi was clearly drunk from the onset and it would have been apparent to anyone else at the scene. At one point while making his testimony, Subramaniam was feeling unwell and another witness had to take his place to testify in court.

Vijayan's main defences were sudden and grave provocation and self-defence. After he opted to enter his defence, Vijayan testified that Murthi approached him and threatened that he would kill him since he had previously murdered people before, and aside from verbally abusing Vijayan, Murthi allegedly assaulted him and wanted to use a chopper to use on Vijayan, and Subramaniam also came to beat him. Vijayan claimed that he was angered at Murthi's actions and abuse, and a struggle therefore ensued between him and Murthi, and the chopper fell onto the ground. Vijayan testified that he quickly retrieved the chopper before Murthi could do so, and attacked him using the chopper. Vijayan denied that he intentionally murdered Murthi, and he summarily insisted that he killed Murthi in a moment of uncontrollable anger and instinctively out of self-defence.

On 26 November 1974, the trial judges - Justice A V Winslow and Justice T Kulasekaram - delivered their verdict, with Justice Winslow pronouncing the decision in court. Justice Winslow stated that the judges unanimously considered Subramaniam and many other prosecution witnesses as "truthful witnesses", and they did not believe Vijayan's story. The judges accepted the arguments of DPP Ang that there was no chopper attack or assault initiated by Murthi prior to the stabbing, and hence his claims of self-defence were not to be believed. Additionally, the judges took issue with the other defence of sudden and grave provocation, finding that Vijayan was not provoked and had not lost his self-control at the time of the murder, given the fact that Murthi's words did not amount to provocative remarks and taking into consideration Murthi's state of intoxication at the material time, it was clear that Vijayan wanted to take this opportunity to finish off Murthi once and for all; this was corroborated by Vijayan's decision to grab ahold of the chopper, which showed that he intended to murder Murthi.

Based on the above findings, the trial court decided that there were sufficient grounds to return with a guilty verdict of murder in Vijayan's case. Therefore, 21-year-old K. Vijayan Krishnan was found guilty of murder, and sentenced to death by hanging.

== Appeal process ==
On 22 April 1975, Vijayan's appeal was dismissed by the Court of Appeal. The appellate court's three judges - Supreme Court judges Choor Singh and Tan Ah Tah, and Chief Justice Wee Chong Jin - dismissed the appeal on the grounds that the defence of sudden and grave provocation was untenable in light of Vijayan's disproportionate violence to the provocation given by Murthi in his drunken state. They also referred to precedent court cases from India and cited that based on the "reasonable man test", any person belonging to the same class of society as Vijayan would not have become so provoked as to lose his self-control in similar situations or mental backgrounds like Vijayan's, which was also the reason behind the dismissal of Vijayan's appeal. Vijayan was defended by veteran lawyer and opposition politician David Saul Marshall, while the prosecution was led by Tan Teow Yeow during the appeal session.

On 18 December 1975, Vijayan's second legal appeal was rejected by the Privy Council in London. Similarly, on the same day, the Privy Council also rejected the appeals of both Pehn Kwan Jin and Jorge Belardo Belleza against their death sentences. Pehn, a seaman, was found guilty of murdering a vegetable seller Tan Eng Kim in 1973 while Belleza, a mechanic of Filipino descent, was convicted of killing his lover Alice Ong in 1974. Pehn and Belleza were both hanged since then; Pehn was executed on 16 April 1976 while Belleza's date of execution was unknown.

In a final bid to escape the gallows, Vijayan petitioned for clemency from the President of Singapore in February 1976. However, his death sentence was not commuted due to the rejection of his plea.

== Execution ==
K. Vijayan Krishnan was hanged in Changi Prison at dawn on 30 April 1976.

== Aftermath ==
In the aftermath of Vijayan's execution, his case became a precedent case study with regards to the defence of sudden and grave provocation.

Vijayan's case had an effect on other murder cases in Singapore. Notably, in the case of Ithinin Kamari, who was charged with the double murder of Mohamed Johar Selamat and Mohd Said Abdul Majid in 1989. His defence of sudden and grave provocation was rejected in accordance to the facts laid out by the Vijayan case, as Ithinin's actions of stabbing both Mohamed Johar and Mohd Said to death were out of proportion to the alleged verbal abuse he received from the victims, and his defence of sudden and grave provocation thus failed. Ithinin was therefore convicted and given two death sentences for the double murder in 1992, and he was put to death after losing his appeal in 1993.

In 1998, Vijayan's case was recalled in light of the landmark ruling of the Kwan Cin Cheng case, where it pertained to a man charged with the murder of his girlfriend, Phang Ai Looi. The ruling, which sentenced Kwan to life imprisonment for manslaughter, stated that per the "reasonable man test", Kwan's actions of killing Phang in an uncontrollable rage due to Phang insulting him and claiming she was happier with another man were done due to loss of self-control, based on the mental background where Kwan shared a de facto husband-wife relationship with Phang despite not being officially married, and his defence of sudden and grave provocation was accepted. The Vijayan case and several others (including Ithinin) were recalled among the iconic cases of a murder suspect raising a defence of sudden and grave provocation in court against the murder charge.

== See also ==
- Capital punishment in Singapore
