= Queenstown, Singapore =

Planning Area and HDB Town in Central Region, Singapore

Queenstown
- Planning Area and HDB Town

Other transcription(s)
  - Chinese: 女皇鎮; Nǚhuángzhèn (Pinyin) lú-hông-tìn / lír-hông-tìn (Hokkien POJ)
  - Malay: Queenstown
  - Tamil: குவீன்ஸ்டவுன் Kuvīṉsṭavuṉ (Transliteration)
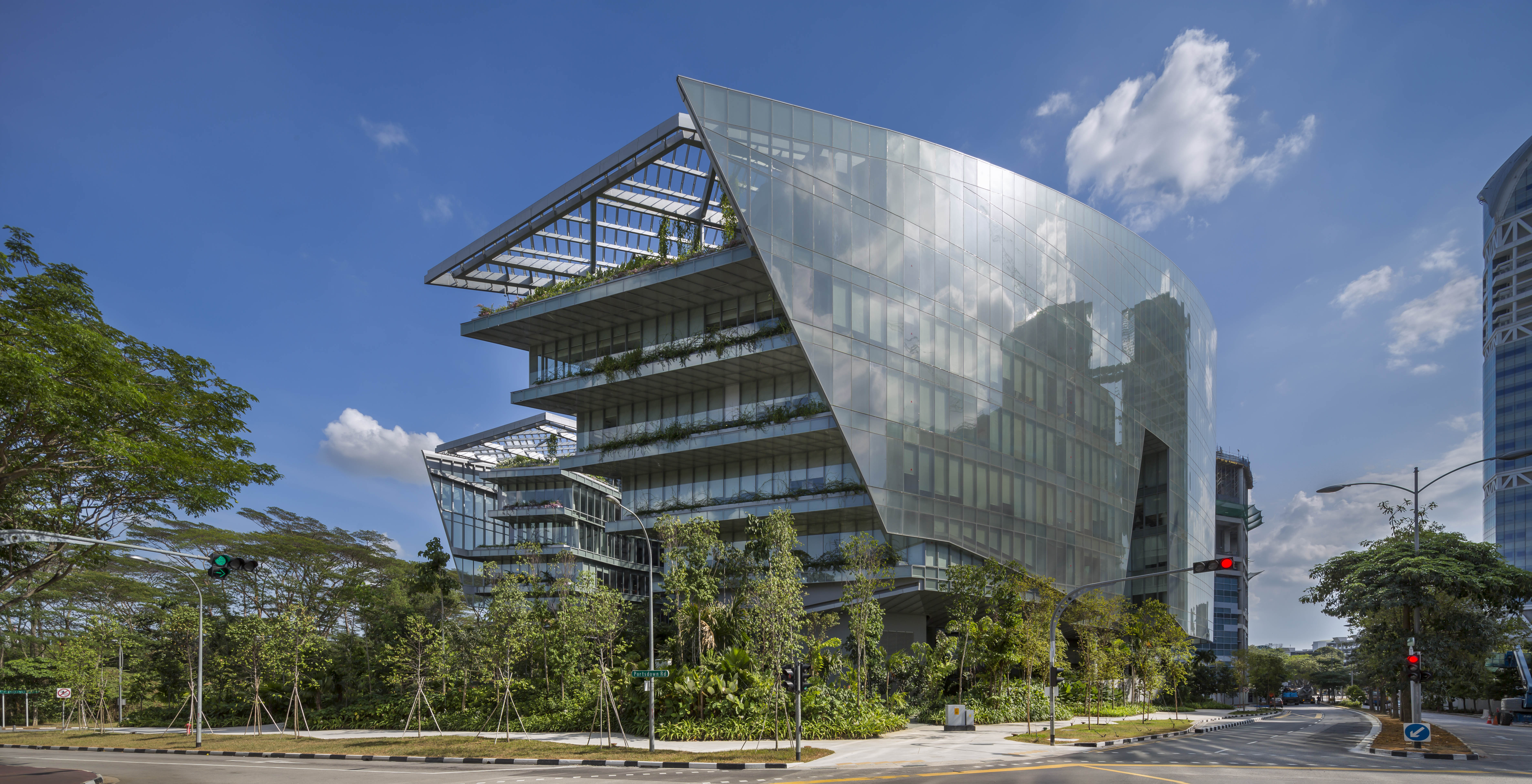
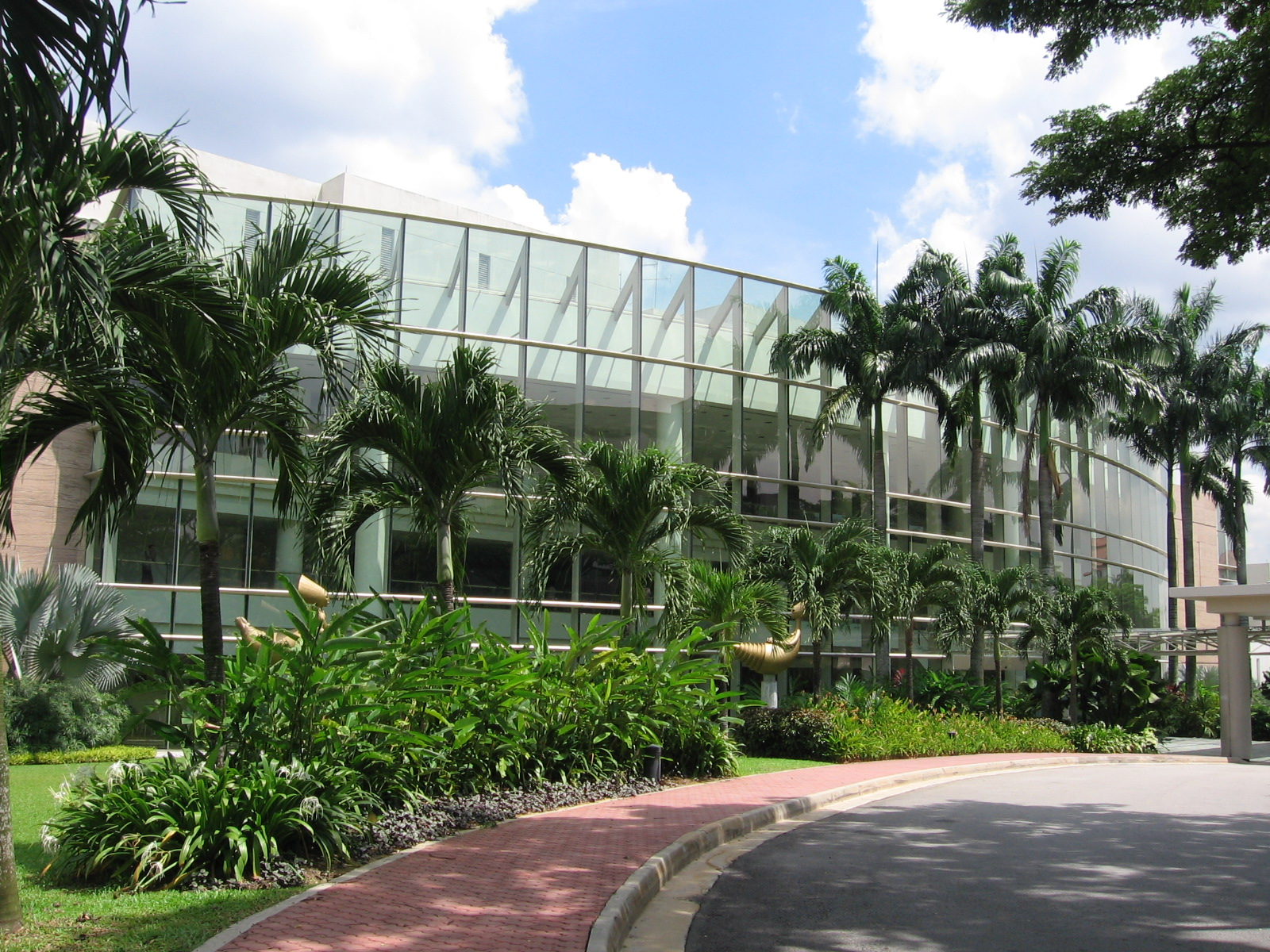
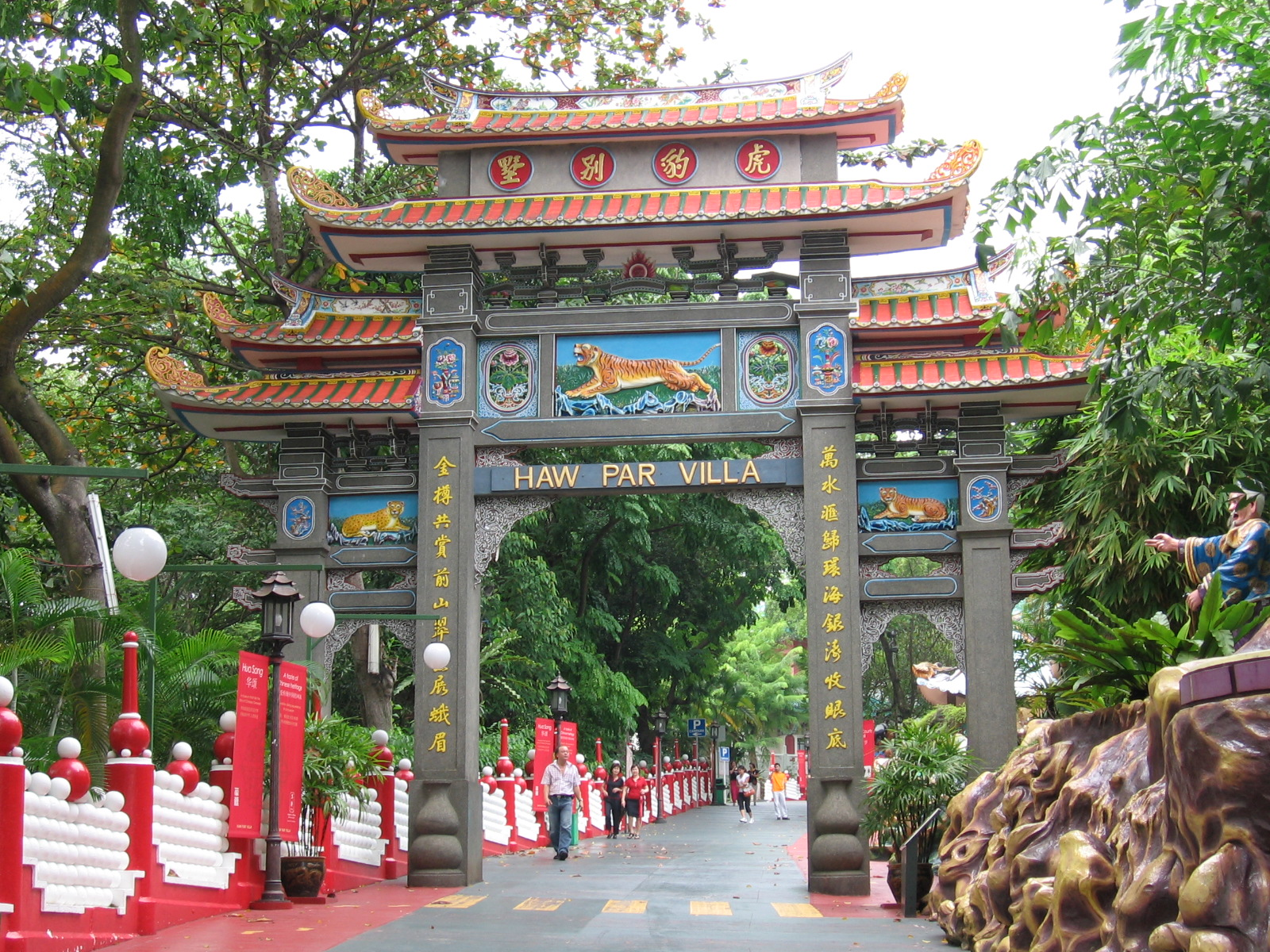
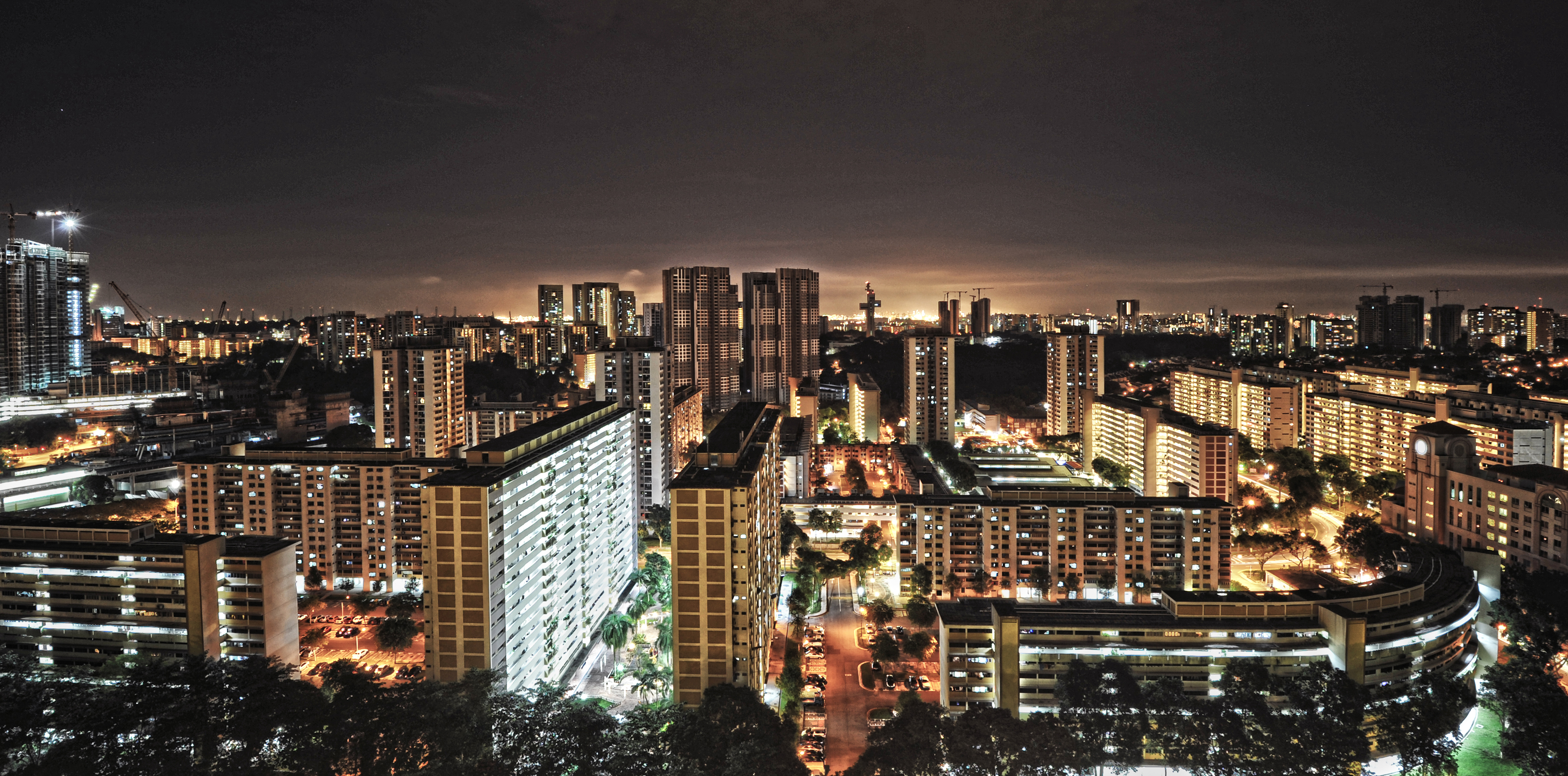
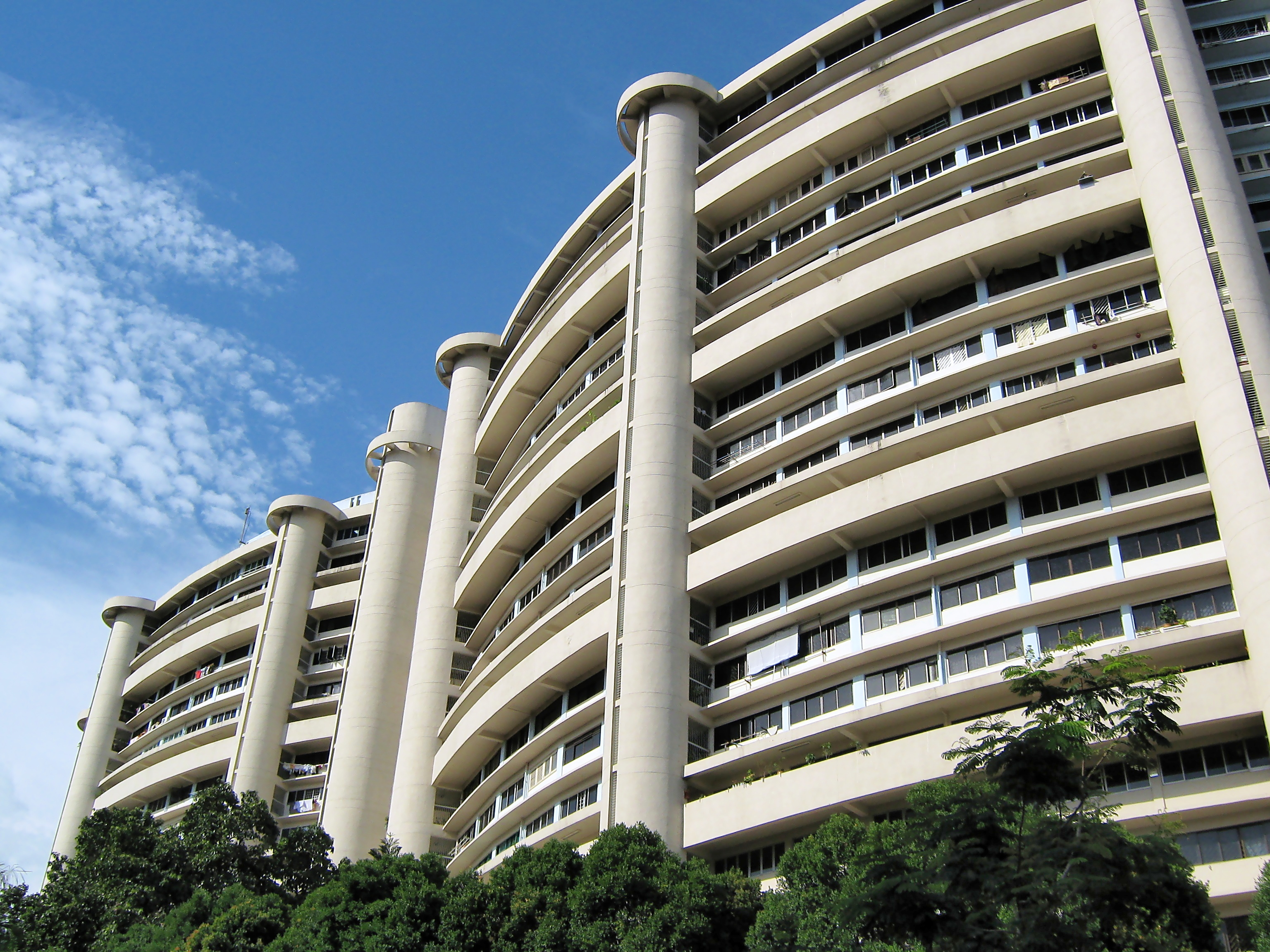
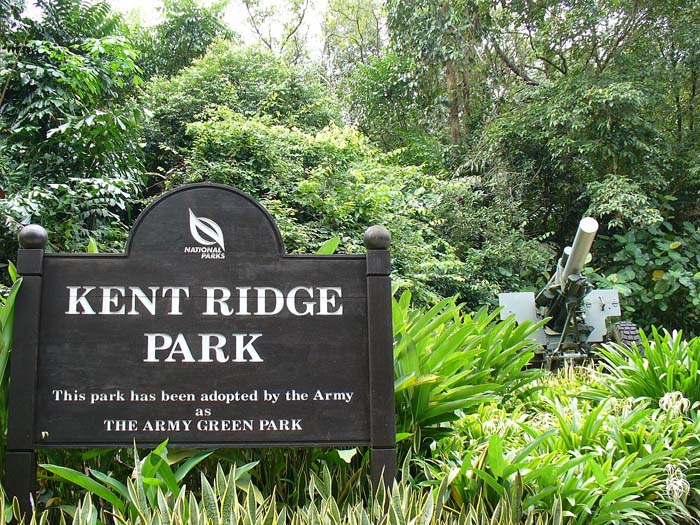
- From top to bottom: The Sandcrawler at One North, University Cultural Centre at the Kent Ridge campus of the National University of Singapore, Haw Par Villa, Panoramic view of Ghim Moh at night, HDB flats along Queensway, Kent Ridge Park.
- Location of Queenstown in Singapore
- Location in Central Region

- Queenstown in Singapore Queenstown (Asia) Queenstown (Earth)
- Coordinates: 1°17′39″N 103°47′10″E
- Country: Singapore
- Region: Central Region
- CDCs: Central Singapore CDC; North West CDC; South West CDC
- Town councils: Holland-Bukit Panjang Town Council; Tanjong Pagar Town Council; West Coast Town Council
- Constituencies: Holland-Bukit Timah GRC; Tanjong Pagar GRC; West Coast-Jurong West GRC; Queenstown SMC

Government
  - Mayors: Central Singapore CDC: Denise Phua; North West CDC: Alex Yam; South West CDC: Low Yen Ling
  - Members of Parliament: Holland-Bukit Timah GRC: Christopher De Souza; Queenstown SMC: Eric Chua; Tanjong Pagar GRC: Chan Chun Sing; Rachel Ong; Joan Pereira; West Coast-Jurong West GRC: Desmond Lee

Area
  - Total: 21.68 km^{2} (8.37 sq mi)
  - Residential: 2.10 km^{2} (0.81 sq mi)

Population (2026)
  - Total: 101,970
  - Density: 4,703/km^{2} (12,180/sq mi)
- Postal districts: 3, 5
- Dwelling units: 30,546
- Projected ultimate: 60,000

Queenstown is a planning area and satellite residential town situated on the south-westernmost fringe of the Central Region of Singapore. It borders Bukit Timah to the north, Tanglin to the northeast, Bukit Merah to the east and southeast, as well as Clementi to the northwest and west. Its southern and southwesternmost limits are bounded by the Pandan Strait.

Developed by the Singapore Improvement Trust in the 1950s and subsequently by the Housing and Development Board in the 1960s, Queenstown was the first satellite town to be built in the country. Most apartments within the township consists of simple one, two, or three-room flats, typically in low-rise, walk-up blocks. Major development work was carried out during the first Five-Year Building Programme between 1960 and 1965. A total of 19,372 dwelling units were constructed between 1952 and 1968.

The headquarters of Grab, Razer and the Asia-Pacific Economic Cooperation (APEC) are located in Queenstown.

== Etymology ==
Queenstown was named after Queen Elizabeth II to mark Her Majesty's coronation in 1953. The area was previously known by the Hokkien name Boh Beh Kang (simplified Chinese: 无尾涧; traditional Chinese: 無尾澗; Pe̍h-ōe-jī: Bô-bé-kàn). The arterial road Queensway was officially named in 1954.

== History ==
Previously, the area which Queenstown currently occupies was a large swampy valley with a channel running through in a southeastern direction. On either side of this agricultural area were hills – feng xing and feng ling. The former was a rubber plantation and the latter, a cemetery also known as boh beh kang. The village in the area, with mainly Hokkien and Teochew-speaking dwellers was also the area inhabited by hundreds of people in attap-roofed huts, cultivating vegetables, growing fruits and rearing pigs and chickens. Buller Camp, a British military camp, was also set up there until 1953 when it was cleared for the new housing estate.

During World War II, Pasir Panjang Ridge became a battleground during the Japanese Invasion of Singapore, where a fierce battle was fought between the defending Malay Regiment and the Japanese troops in February 1942. Despite its valiant efforts to defend Bukit Chandu (Opium Hill in Malay), a key strategic defence position, the Malay Regiment was eventually defeated as it was greatly outnumbered. In 2002, a war museum was opened in Bukit Chandu to commemorate the Battle of Pasir Panjang.

In 1947, the Housing Committee of Singapore highlighted the problem of inadequate housing in Singapore. The report proposed the decentralisation of the population away from the city with the building of self-contained residential areas in the suburbs. This proposal was believed to be an influence of the New town movements in post-war Britain.

The area was subsequently chosen by Singapore Improvement Trust (SIT) as a site for housing development due to its proximity to the successful first public housing scheme in Tiong Bahru. Plans for the development of the area were first announced to the general public on 27 September 1953, with construction of Queenstown's first estate, Princess Margaret Estate (named after HM Elizabeth II's younger sister) having already begun last in July last year. By late 1953, a preliminary batch of 3-room flats was ready for occupation. By 1956, work on the Princess Margaret Estate (later shortened to Princess Estate) had more than 1,000 flats comprising one, two and three-room units and 68 terrace houses. A ceremony was held in October that year for Forfar House, a 14-storey block which was a prominent landmark in those days as it was the tallest HDB flat at that point of time.

The area continued to develop as a self-contained community. Some of the facilities and amenities developed included the Town Centre and the Swimming and Sports Complex. The former was fully completed in 1969 with three cinemas and a variety of outlets including an emporium, a fresh food market, a maternity and child health centre, a bowling alley and a nightclub cum restaurant. The swimming complex was completed in August 1970.

In the 1970s, the success of the new town led to the development of Buona Vista and Holland Village, using the older neighbourhoods of Queenstown as a model. However, by the 1980s, the area had become a mature estate with a higher proportion of senior citizens residing in the area than elsewhere, and a gradual migration of the younger generation into other HDB new towns.

== Geography ==
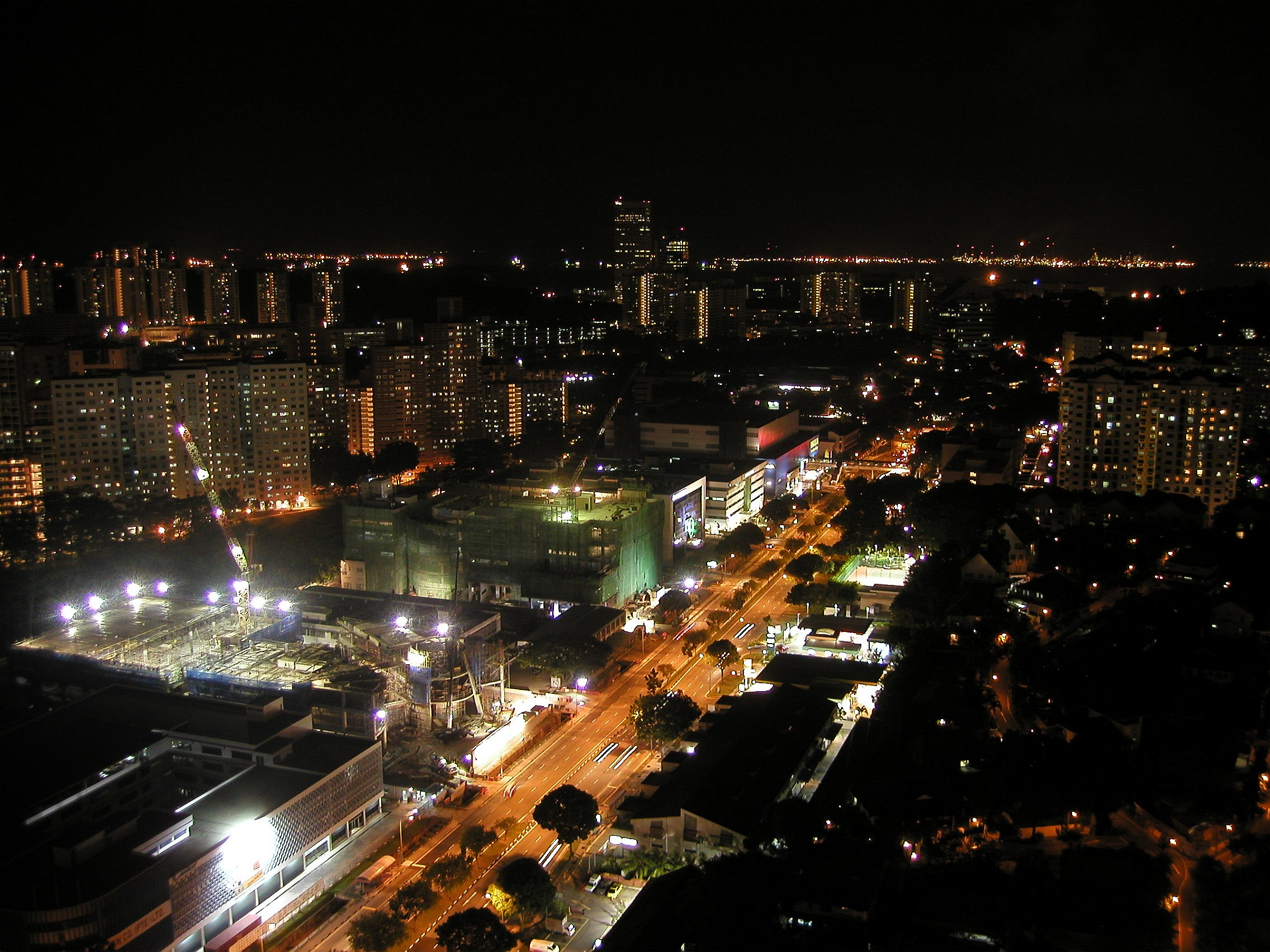
Alexandra Road, where the boundary between the towns of Bukit Merah and Queenstown meet. Beyond the lane to the left is Alexendra Hill in Bukit Merah while the area beyond the right lane is located in Queensway, Queenstown. The Alexandra outlet of IKEA can be seen in the distance.

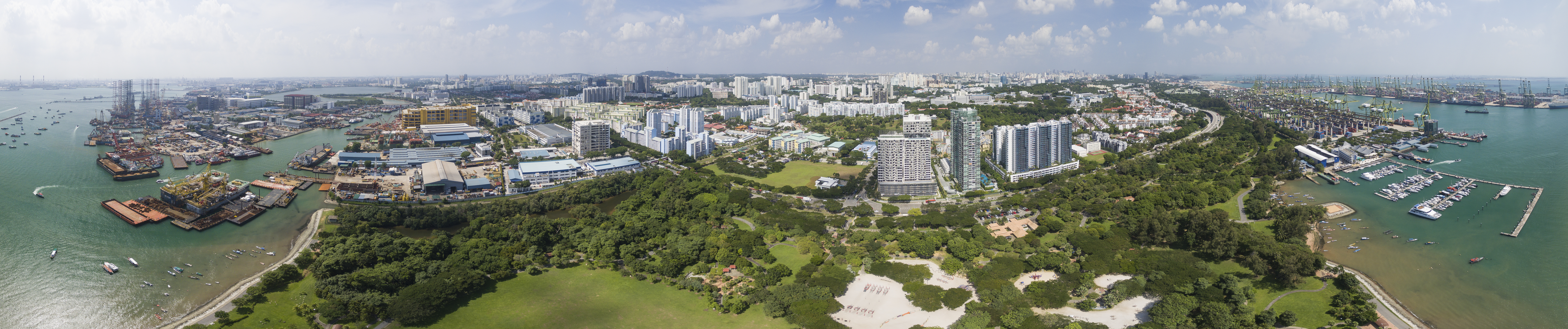
Aerial panorama of West Coast Park in 2016

Queenstown is bounded by the Ulu Pandan Canal, Ghim Moh Housing Estate and the former Tanglin Camp area to the north, Alexandra Road to the east, Clementi Road to the west and the sea to the south. It covers an area of approximately 2,188 ha. The total population (1990 census) is 126,071 with 31,131 housing units. It consists of 16 subzones, namely Ghim Moh, Holland Drive, Commonwealth, Tanglin Halt, Margaret Drive, Mei Chin, Queensway, Portsdown, Buona Vista, Singapore Polytechnic, Dover, National University, Kent Ridge, Pasir Panjang, Pasir Panjang II, and the Port.

Pasir Panjang lies to the south of Queenstown (Pasir Panjang in Malay means "long sandy beach"). The coastline was dotted with Malay villages, the main economic activities being fishing and small-scale agriculture. Only after the war, did the development of the area begin, with bungalows along the coastline being built in the 1950s. Today, Pasir Panjang is a popular recreational area for sea sports and attractions such as the Haw Par Villa.

=== Political boundaries ===
The Queenstown planning area once existed as Keppel Constituency before being split into numerous constituencies in 1955 such as Pasir Panjang Constituency and the eponymous Queenstown Constituency. When the Group Representation Constituency scheme was introduced in 1988, the namesake Queenstown constituency was subsumed into either the Brickworks GRC or Pasir Panjang GRC at first, then followed by Holland-Bukit Timah GRC, Tanjong Pagar GRC and West Coast GRC in the later elections' redrawing.

As of the recent 2025 election, the namesake Queenstown division from Tanjong Pagar GRC was separated as a SMC. The namesake Queenstown SMC covers Margaret Drive and portions of Mei Chin; the Telok Blangah division once formerly part of West Coast GRC (comprising the sub-districts of Kent Ridge, Dover, and one-north, as well as most of Pasir Panjang and Buona Vista) were part of Tanjong Pagar GRC, which also include Tanglin Halt and Ghim Moh. Some of Ghim Moh and Holland Drive falls under the Holland-Bukit Timah GRC, while the southern Queenstown parts falls under the West Coast GRC, now renamed as West Coast-Jurong West GRC.

== Main housing estates ==
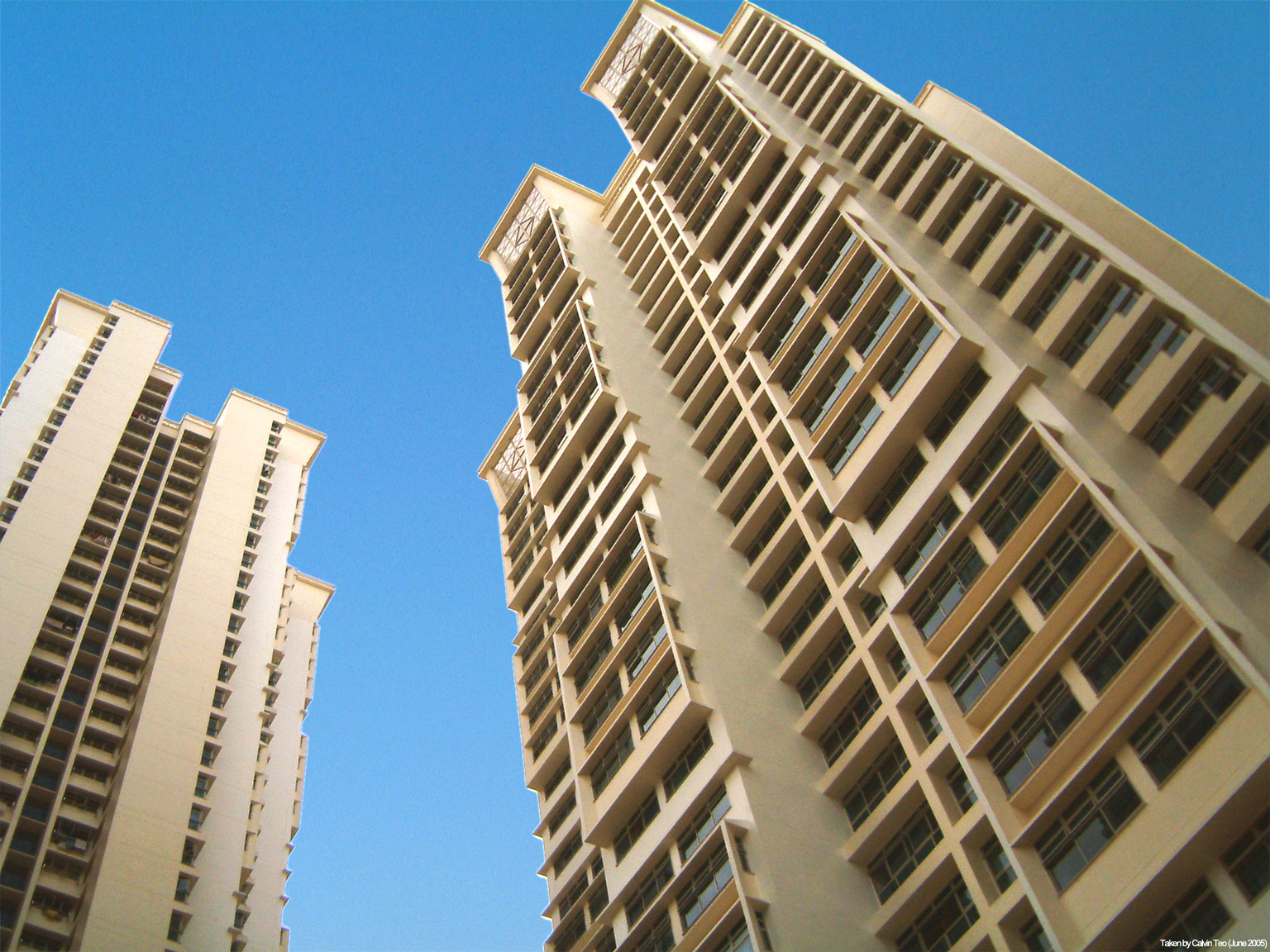
Forfar Heights

The main housing areas within Queenstown include:

- Princess Estate is the first subdistrict of the Queenstown District consists of several precincts like Strathmore and Dawson. It is also the first rebuilt estate under SERS.
- Duchess Estate is the second subdistrict of Queenstown district which consists of Queenstown Centre and Margaret Drive. Several blocks of 2-storey and 3-storey flats are located in this area. It is also the second rebuilt estate under SERS.
- Tanglin Halt consists of rows of ten storey flats. The remaining HDB flats at Tanglin Halt will be demolished by 2021. It is also the third rebuilt estate under SERS.
- Commonwealth Estate is located near Commonwealth MRT station and consists of precincts like Commonwealth Close and Commonwealth Crescent. It is best known for having a fantastic view of Singapore's Downtown. It is also the fourth rebuilt estate under SERS, to be demolished together with Tanglin Halt.
- Queen's Close is a cluster of flats bounded by Mei Ling district, Portsdown Road and Alexandra Road. Queen's Crescent is now demolished and redevelopment will only begin in 2021.
- Mei Ling/Mei Chin is built from the excavation of two hills, Hong Lim and Hong Yin Hill which are used for cemetery purposes. It is also where Queenstown district got its name Boh Beh Kang, or a river with no source.
- Buona Vista is the last district built in Queenstown. However, it has developed a distinct and unique identity today that is commonly not linked with Queenstown.
- Dover is a small neighbourhood located in the south of Buona Vista. It is also commonly not associated with Queenstown despite being under its planning area. Dover is known to have many schools around its neighbourhood and National University of Singapore and Singapore Polytechnic is also located in this region.
- Ghim Moh is an estate located beside Buona Vista known for its attractive food. It consists of 28 blocks.

=== Forfar Heights ===
Forfar House, or Block 39, was built in 1956 by the Singapore Improvement Trust (SIT) as a 14-storey block (which at that time was the tallest residential building in Singapore, holding the record until the building of a 20-story block at Selegie in 1963). Also known as Chap Si Lao, it was an early part of the mixed height development of the area. The new blocks at Forfar Heights are featured with blue glazing and blue floodlights at the roofline, reminiscent of the early days, where many units were characterised by the blue glass in their windows, by which the district was acquired its Hokkien name Lam Po Lay.

Block 39, Forfar Square, had 106 three-room-flats, four shops, and an eating house, until it was demolished in the early 2000s together with the surrounding SIT blocks under the Selective En bloc Redevelopment Scheme (SERS). The new Forfar Heights consists of two 40-storey blocks (Blk 48, 52) and three 30-storey blocks (Blk 49–51). The new flats was offered to residents from the old Forfar House and Blocks 6A & 6B Margaret Drive in 1996, and residents from Block 172–175 Stirling Road and Block 96 Margaret Drive in 2001. The new blocks were launched on Tree Planting Day 2005 and SERS Completion Ceremony on 6 November 2005 with guest of honour, Minister Mentor Lee Kuan Yew who was a Member of Parliament for Tanjong Pagar Group Representation Constituency (GRC).

The name for Forfar Heights had its origin from Forfar Square, which like most Queenstown street names, was connected to the British royal family. The name Forfar comes from The Royal Burgh of Forfar, a Scottish town near the childhood home of Queen Elizabeth the Queen Mother. (Note: Ballater Close and Forfar Square(former road area Change to unnamed road for some reason).)

== Demographics ==
=== Population history ===
Resident population history
Year	Pop.	±% p.a.
2000	97,860	—
2005	92,970	−1.02%
2010	98,500	+1.16%
2015	98,050	−0.09%
2020	95,930	−0.44%
2025	101,480	+1.13%
2026	101,970	+0.48%

=== Age profile ===
The data below is from the population report published by the Singapore Department of Statistics as of June 2026.

Age group (years)	Males	Females	Total population	% of total population
0–4	1,780	1,730	3,510	3.44
5–9	1,870	1,840	3,710	3.64
10–14	2,290	2,140	4,430	4.34
15–19	2,260	2,210	4,470	4.38
20–24	2,230	2,350	4,580	4.49
25–29	2,940	3,080	6,020	5.90
30–34	3,620	3,900	7,520	7.37
35–39	3,660	4,100	7,760	7.61
40–44	3,330	3,910	7,240	7.10
45–49	3,470	4,100	7,570	7.42
50–54	3,720	4,150	7,870	7.72
55–59	3,370	3,730	7,100	6.96
60–64	3,340	3,480	6,820	6.69
65–69	2,810	3,230	6,040	5.92
70–74	2,440	3,090	5,530	5.42
75–79	2,100	3,120	5,220	5.12
80–84	1,100	1,750	2,850	2.79
85–89	810	1,530	2,340	2.29
90+	420	990	1,410	1.38

Age group (years)	Males	Females	Total population	% of total population
0–14	5,940	5,710	11,650	11.4
15–64	31,940	35,010	66,950	65.7
65+	9,680	13,710	23,390	22.9

Population pyramid of Queenstown in 2026

The population distribution of Queenstown in 2026 demonstrates a super-aged population structure. There is a higher population concentration among middle-aged groups, with the highest concentration of residents between 50 and 54 years old at 7.72%. Specifically, the male population peaks at the 50-54 age range at 3.65%, and the female population peaks at the 45-49 age range at 4.07%.

Notably, Queenstown has a high proportion of elderly residents aged above 65, constituting 22.9% of all residents. This is more than double the children population (11.4% aged between 0 and 14), indicating a declining younger demographic and a super-aged population.

=== Household ===
Resident population by dwelling type in Queenstown (2000−2026)
Year	HDB flats		Condominiums and other apartments		Landed properties	
Year	Pop.	Percentage	Pop.	Percentage	Pop.	Percentage
2000	85,730	87.6%	6,800	6.9%	3,700	3.8%
2005	78,670	84.6%	9,500	10.2%	3,530	3.8%
2010	83,000	84.3%	10,330	10.5%	3,700	3.8%
2015	81,870	83.5%	11,140	11.4%	3,740	3.8%
2020	79,040	82.4%	11,910	12.4%	3,540	3.7%
2025	76,930	75.8%	19,280	19%	3,490	3.4%
2026	76,700	75.2%	19,970	19.6%	3,520	3.5%

Among the population, 27,890 residents, or 27.3% of the population, live in 4-room HDB Flats, making it the most common type of dwelling. This is closely followed by residents living in 5-room and executive HDB flats (27,520 residents, 27.0%).

As of 2025, the average household size in Queenstown is approximately 2.76, considerably lower than the national average of 3.1. Among the 40,100 households in Queenstown, the most common household size is two persons, representing 27.4% of total households. This is followed by a household size of three persons, representing 21.7% of all households.

Queenstown has a home ownership rate of 85.5% as of 2025. This is lower than the national home ownership rate of 91.2%, reflecting a higher prevalence of households renting their homes in Queenstown.

=== Ethnicity ===
Ethnic groups in Queenstown (2000−2020)
Year	Chinese		Malays		Indians		Others	
Year	Pop.	Percentage	Pop.	Percentage	Pop.	Percentage	Pop.	Percentage
2000	77,367	79.1%	10,849	11.1%	7,933	8.1%	1,714	1.8%
2010	77,187	78.4%	8,294	8.4%	8,518	8.6%	4,503	4.6%
2015	77,390	78.9%	8,720	8.9%	8,000	8.2%	3,950	4%
2020	78,220	81.5%	6,940	7.2%	7,060	7.4%	3,710	3.9%
2025	83,500	82.3%	6,510	6.4%	6,960	6.9%	4,500	4.4%

As of 2025, Queenstown has a lower level of ethnic diversity as compared to the national average. This is due to the significantly larger proportion of Chinese residents (82.3%) and a smaller proportion of Malay residents (6.4%) as compared to the national average of 73.9% and 13.5% respectively.

=== Religion ===
Religious affiliation in Queenstown (2025 est.)
1. No religion (30.3%)
2. Buddhism (28.8%)
3. Christianity (24.1%)
4. Islam (7.10%)
5. Hinduism (5.00%)
6. Taoism (4.20%)
7. Sikhism (0.30%)

The largest group in Queenstown consists of residents with no religion, numbering 27,600 (30.3% of the population). This is followed by Buddhism, with 26,300 practising residents (28.8%), and Christianity, with 22,000 Christians (24.1%), including 7,500 Catholics (8.2%). Other religious affiliations include Islam (6,500 residents, 7.1%), Hinduism (4,600 residents, 5.0%), Taoism (3,800 residents, 4.2%), and Sikhism (300 residents, 0.33%).

Queenstown has a significantly higher proportion of residents with no religion (30.3%), and Christians (24.1%), as compared to the national average of 23.9% and 7.6% respectively.

=== Education ===
As of 2025, 98.6% of the population above 15 is literate. 70.5% of residents are literate in two languages, with the most common language pair being English and Chinese (56.0%). 4.9% of Queenstown residents are literate in three or more languages.

Highest qualification attained of non-student resident population aged 15 years and over (2025 est.)
Qualification	Percentage	Singapore average
Below secondary	23.1%	19.9%
Secondary	12.4%	14.6%
Post-secondary (non-tertiary)	7.1%	11.1%
Polytechnic diploma	6.3%	10.2%
Professional qualification and other diploma	6.8%	7.5%
University	44.3%	36.7%

As of 2025, 44.3% of residents in Queenstown have a university qualification, considerably above the national average of 36.7%.

=== Language ===
Languages most frequently spoken at home, Queenstown (2025 est.)
Languages	percent
English	55.4%
Mandarin Chinese	28.2%
Non-Mandarin varieties	8.5%
Malay	4.1%
Tamil	1.97%
Others	1.23%
Other Indian languages	0.74%

The proportion of residents in Queenstown using non-Mandarin varieties as their most frequently spoken language (8.5%) is the considerably higher than the national average (4.9%). This places Queenstown as the planning area with the second-highest proportion of speakers of non-Mandarin varieties, behind Bukit Merah.

Additionally, there are 1,600 Tamil speakers, representing 72.72% of the 2,200 Indian language speakers in Queenstown.

=== Employment and income ===
According to the 2025 General Household Survey, 59,700 of residents aged 15 years and over in Queenstown are employed, out of the 61,500 in the labour force. This equates to an employment rate of 97.1%, higher than the national average of 96.7%. The remaining 29,700 residents (32.6%) aged above 15 in Queenstown are outside the labour force.

Gross monthly employment income of employed residents aged 15 years and over (2025 est.)
Employment income	Percentage	Singapore average
Below S$1,000	4.5%	3.9%
S$1,000–S$1,999	9.2%	9.4%
S$2,000–S$2,999	10.1%	9.5%
S$3,000–S$3,999	6.0%	10.3%
S$4,000–S$4,999	6.2%	8.8%
S$5,000–S$5,999	5.9%	8.2%
S$6,000–S$6,999	5.9%	6.9%
S$7,000–S$7,999	6.0%	5.9%
S$8,000–S$8,999	3.7%	5.2%
S$9,000–S$9,999	4.7%	4.5%
S$10,000–S$10,999	5.5%	4.3%
S$11,000–S$11,999	4.0%	3.5%
S$12,000–S$14,999	11.2%	7.3%
S$15,000–S$19,999	7.4%	5.8%
S$20,000 and over	9.9%	6.7%

Monthly household employment income (2025 est.)
Household employment income	Percentage	Singapore average
No employed person	19.2%	14.2%
Below S$1,000	2.5%	1.2%
S$1,000–S$1,999	4.0%	3.4%
S$2,000–S$2,999	4.2%	3.7%
S$3,000–S$3,999	2.5%	4.2%
S$4,000–S$4,999	3.2%	3.7%
S$5,000–S$5,999	3.2%	4.1%
S$6,000–S$6,999	3.2%	4.0%
S$7,000–S$7,999	2.7%	3.6%
S$8,000–S$8,999	2.0%	3.8%
S$9,000–S$9,999	3.7%	3.7%
S$10,000–S$10,999	3.2%	3.8%
S$11,000–S$11,999	3.2%	3.7%
S$12,000–S$12,999	3.2%	3.5%
S$13,000–S$13,999	3.0%	3.2%
S$14,000–S$14,999	1.0%	2.8%
S$15,000–S$17,499	5.7%	6.2%
S$17,500–S$19,999	3.2%	5.5%
S$20,000–S$24,999	10.2%	8.0%
S$25,000–S$29,999	6.5%	5.0%
S$30,000–S$34,999	2.5%	3.3%
S$35,000 and over	8.2%	5.5%

== Transportation ==
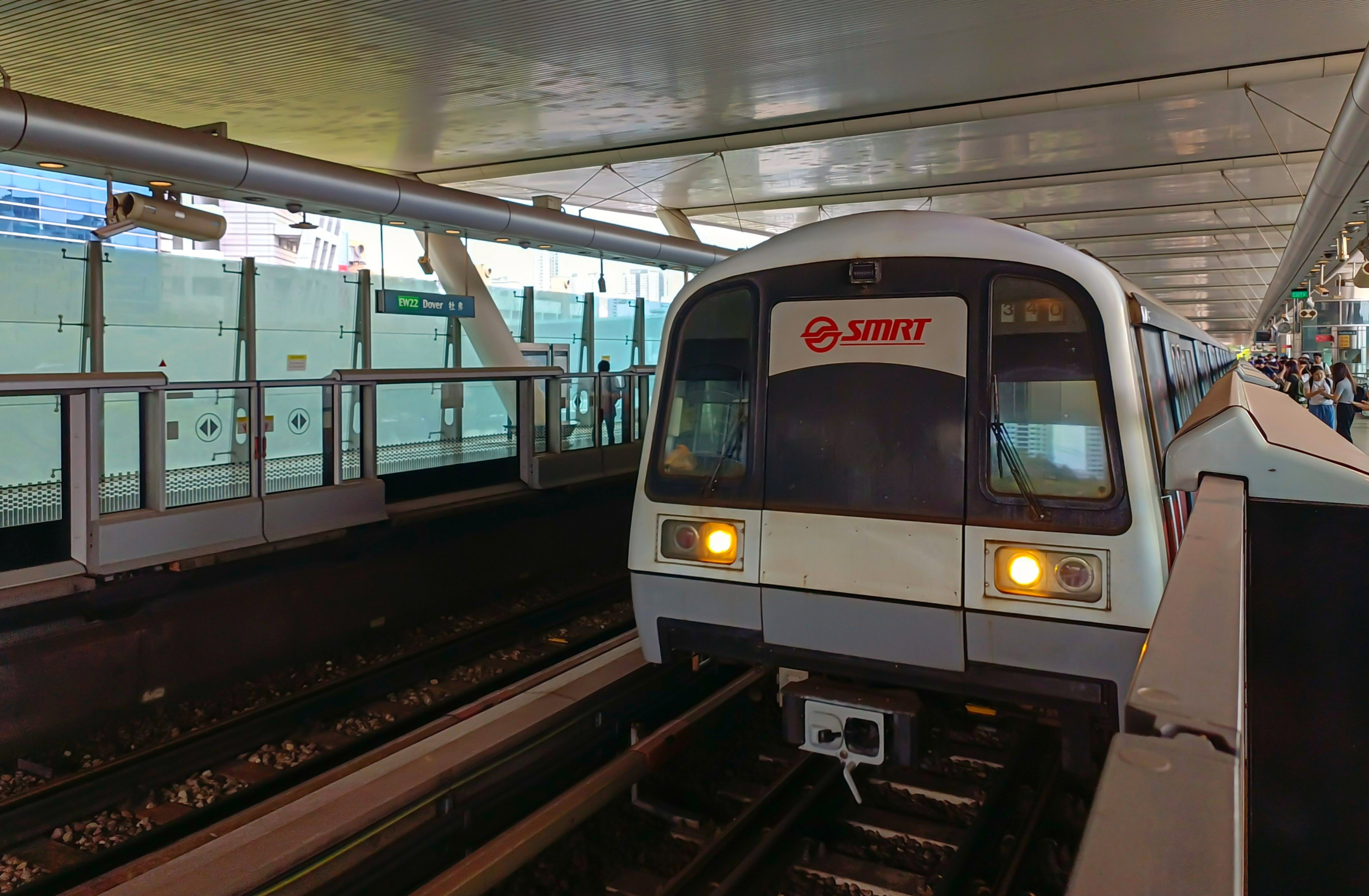
Dover MRT Station platform

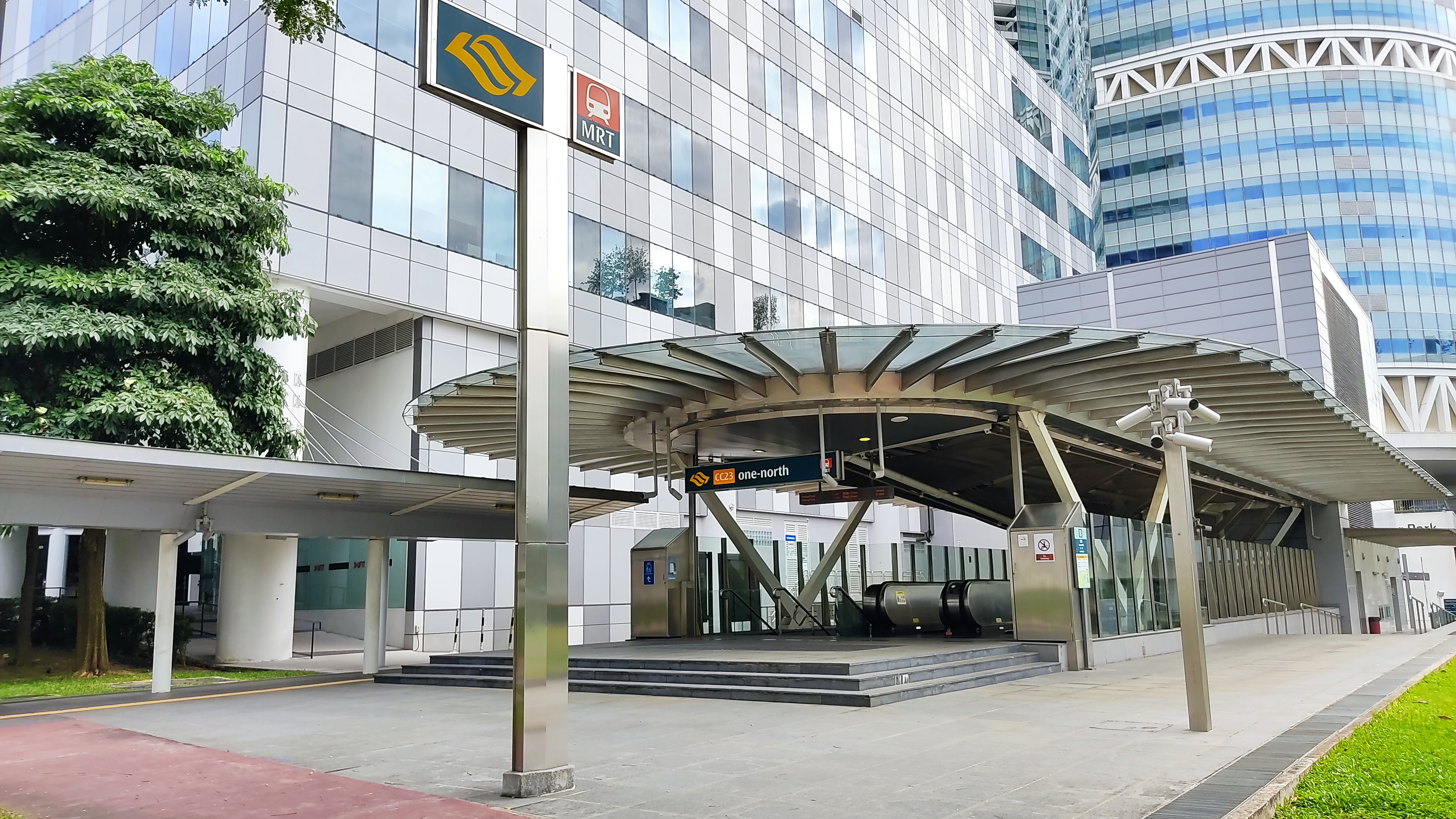
One North MRT Station Exit

=== Mass Rapid Transit ===
There are 9 Mass Rapid Transit stations that serve the planning area, across 2 lines, the East West Line and the Circle Line. Both lines have an interchange station at Buona Vista station. The 9 stations are:

- EW19 Queenstown
- EW20 Commonwealth
- EW21 CC22 Buona Vista
- EW22 Dover
- CC21 Holland Village
- CC23 one-north
- CC24 Kent Ridge
- CC25 Haw Par Villa
- CC26 Pasir Panjang

=== Bus ===
There are 3 bus terminals within the planning area. Buona Vista Bus Terminal is located along Holland Drive while Ghim Moh Bus Terminal is located along Ghim Moh Road. Both of which are near to the Buona Vista MRT Station. Kent Ridge Bus Terminal is located within the vicinity of the Kent Ridge campus of the National University of Singapore, at the western portion of the planning area.

All three bus terminals within the planning area are anchored by Clementi Bus Package under Bus Contracting Model.

=== Roads ===
Queenstown planning area is connected by road to the rest of Singapore via the Ayer Rajah Expressway, a major expressway connecting western Singapore to the Central Area, and also to Johor via the Tuas Second Link. Major roads in the planning area include Queensway, which is part of the Outer Ring Road System (ORRS), a semi-expressway, together with Portsdown Avenue. Queensway intersects with Commonwealth Avenue, a major road that parallels the East West Line and continues into Commonwealth Avenue West at Buona Vista. At the southern portion, the West Coast Highway is a major arterial road that links the district of Pasir Panjang to the Jurong Industrial Estate to the west and the Central Area to the east. At the eastern border with Bukit Merah, Alexandra Road is a major road that connects Pasir Panjang Road with Ayer Rajah Expressway, Queensway and Commonwealth Avenue.

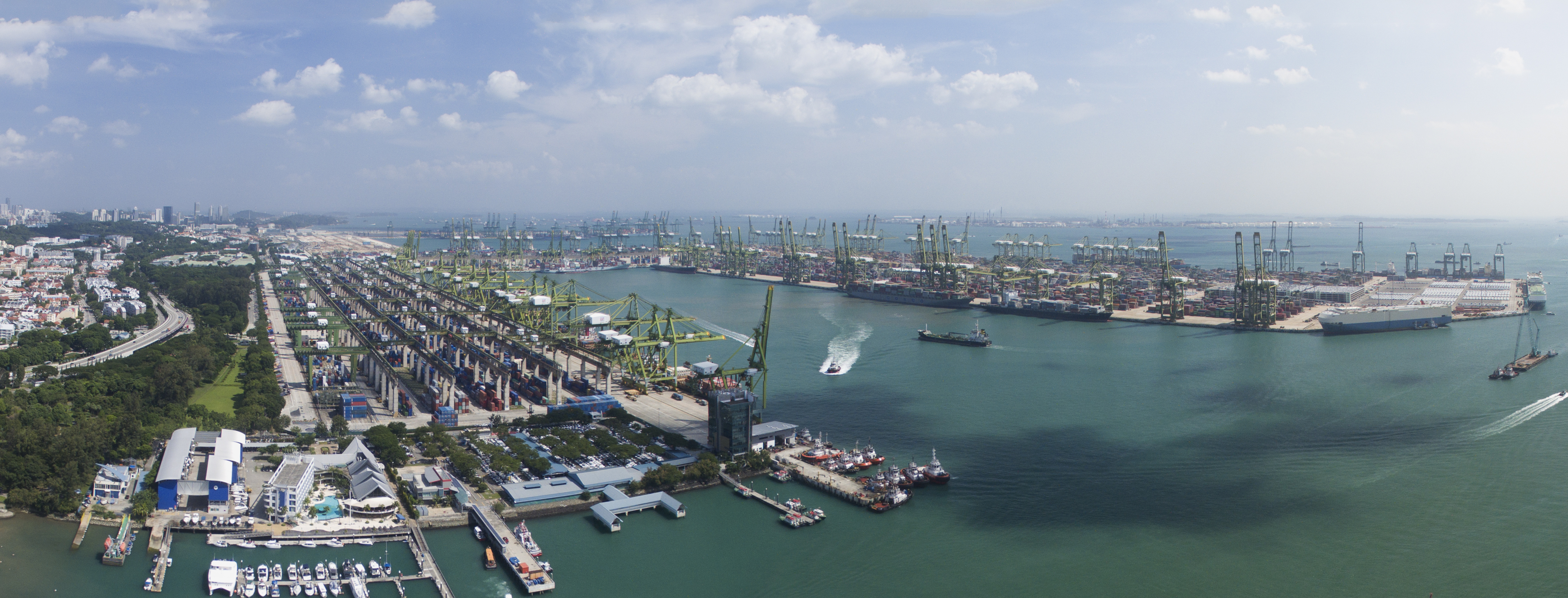
Aerial view of Pasir Panjang Container Terminals

=== Port ===
The Pasir Panjang Container and Multipurpose terminals, which opened in phases from 2000 to 2017, was built off reclaimed land along the coast of Pasir Panjang and supplements the older City Terminals. Located along Harbour Drive in Pasir Panjang, it is currently the largest port facility in the Port of Singapore, operated by PSA. All Pasir Panjang terminals are expected to close by 2040 as operations will be consolidated at Tuas Port.

== Education ==
=== Primary schools ===
- Fairfield Methodist School (Primary)
- New Town Primary School
- Queenstown Primary School

=== Secondary schools ===
- Anglo-Chinese School (Independent)
- Fairfield Methodist School (Secondary)
- New Town Secondary School
- Queenstown Secondary School
- Queensway Secondary School
- School of Science and Technology, Singapore

=== Tertiary institutions ===
- Anglo-Chinese Junior College
- National University of Singapore (Kent Ridge Campus)
- Singapore Institute of Technology (Main Campus until September 2024)
- Singapore Polytechnic

=== Other schools ===
- Anglo-Chinese School (International)
- Dover Court International School
- ESSEC Business School
- INSEAD Asia
- Rainbow Centre
- S P Jain School of Global Management
- Tanglin Trust School
- United World College of South East Asia
- MDIS UniCampus

== Other amenities ==
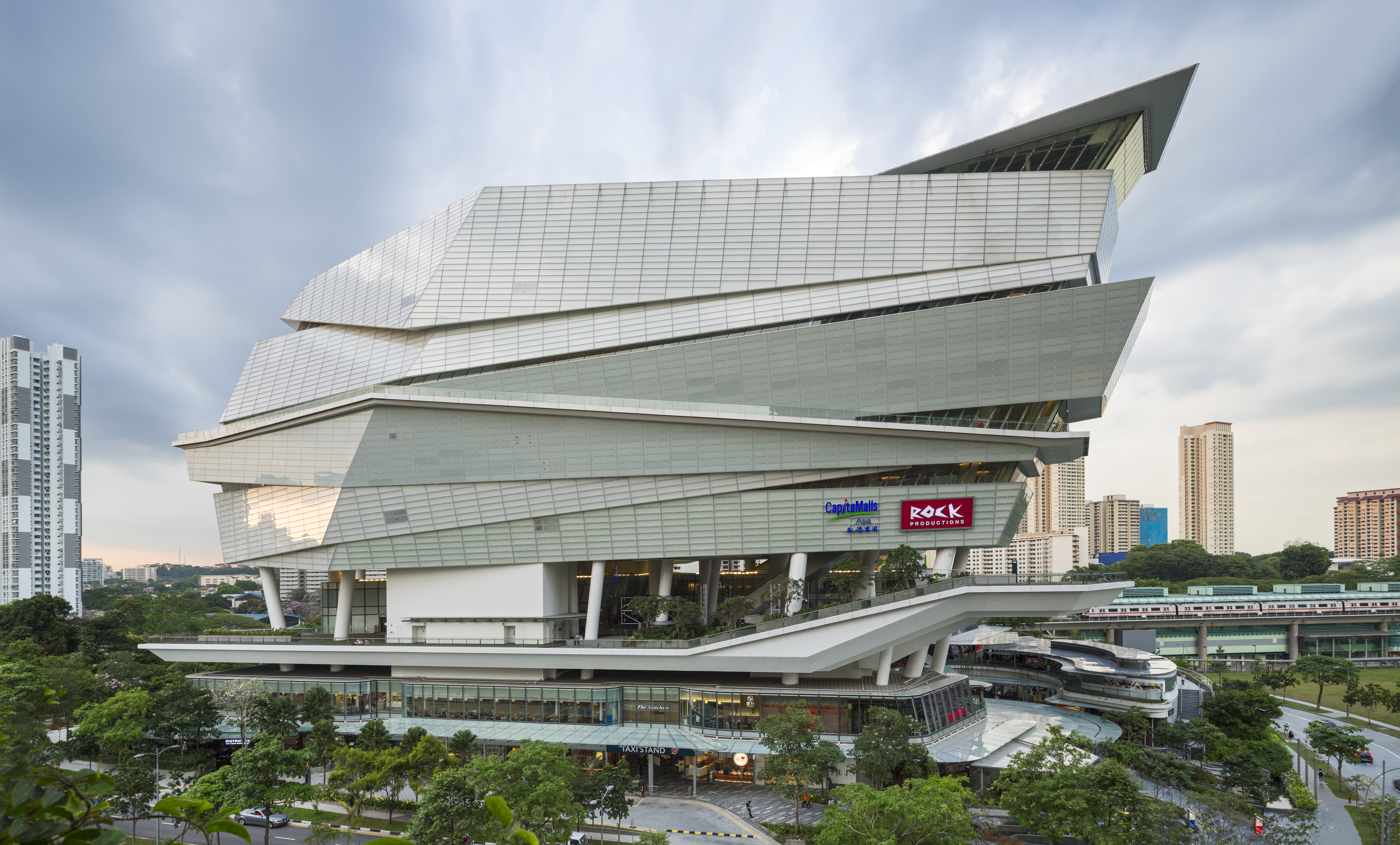
The Star Vista

=== Places of worship ===
==== Chinese temples ====
- Phoh Teck Siang Tng Temple
- Poh Ern Shih Temple
- Tiong Ghee Temple

==== Churches ====
- Aldersgate Methodist Church
- Church of Christ, Pasir Panjang
- Church of our Saviour
- Church of the Blessed Sacrament
- Church Of The Good Shepherd
- Emmanuel Evangelical Free Church
- Faith Methodist Church
- Free Community Church
- Holy Covenant Methodist Church
- Living Waters Methodist Church
- Nazareth Bible-Presbyterian Church
- New Creation Church
- Norwegian Seamen's Mission
- Pasir Panjang Christ Church
- Pasir Panjang Hill Brethren Church
- Queenstown Lutheran Church
- Reformed Evangelical Church (Singapore)
- St. John's - St. Margaret's Church
- The 'Fisherman of Christ' Fellowship

==== Hindu temples ====
- Sri Muneeswaran Temple

==== Mosques ====
- Masjid Ahmad
- Masjid Hang Jebat
- Masjid Hussain Sulaiman
- Masjid Jamek Queenstown
- Masjid Mujahidin
- Musollah Prayer Hall
- Surau Ghim Moh

=== Shopping centres ===
- Alexandra Retail Centre (ARC)
- Anchorpoint
- Dawson Place
- Holland Piazza
- Holland Road Shopping Centre
- Margaret Market
- One Holland Village
- Queensway Shopping Centre
- Raffles Holland V
- Rochester Mall
- The Star Vista
- Viva Vista Shopping Mall

=== Parks ===
- Alexandra Canal Linear Park
- Canterbury Park
- HortPark
- Kent Ridge Park
- one-north Park
- Pasir Panjang Park Connector
- Ridout Tea Garden
- West Coast Park

=== Community centres/clubs ===
- Buona Vista Community Club
- Dover Community Centre
- Queenstown Community Centre
- Ulu Pandan Community Club

=== Sports facilities ===
- Queenstown ActiveSG Stadium
- Sports @ Buona Vista
- Winchester Tennis Arena

=== Hospitals ===
- Alexandra Hospital
- National University Hospital

=== Tourist attractions ===
- Haw Par Villa
- Lee Kong Chian Natural History Museum
- NUS Museum
- Reflections at Bukit Chandu

== See also ==
- My Queenstown Heritage Trail
