= Tanglin Halt double murders =

1989 double murder at Tanglin Halt, Singapore

- Mohamed Johar Selamat (left) and Mohd Said Abdul Majid (right)
- Location: Tanglin Halt, Singapore
- Date: 24 May 1989
- Attack type: Murder
- Weapon: Kitchen knife
- Deaths: 2
- Injuries: 0
- Victims: Mohamed Johar Selamat (33); Mohd Said Abdul Majid (29)
- Perpetrator: Ithinin Kamari (35)
- Motive: Alleged rage due to verbal abuse
- Charges: Murder (x2)
- Verdict: Guilty on both counts of murder Sentenced to death on both counts
- Convictions: Murder (x2)
- Convicted: Ithinin Kamari (35)
- Judge: T S Sinnathuray; Amarjeet Singh

On 24 May 1989, at a flat in Tanglin Halt, 32-year-old Ithinin Kamari fatally stabbed two men - Mohamed Johar Selamat (33) and Mohd Said Abdul Majid (29) - due to the two men, one of whom was his girlfriend's ex-lover, allegedly insulting him. Ithinin was arrested and charged for the double murder, and he claimed that the fatal stabbing was committed due to grave and sudden provocation from the victims. However, in January 1992, Ithinin was found guilty of murdering both Mohd Said and Mohamed Johar, and sentenced to death, due to his actions being grossly out of proportion to the provocation given.

== Fatal stabbing ==
On 24 May 1989, a stabbing incident occurred outside a flat at Tanglin Halt, which resulted in the deaths of two young men, and the killer fled the scene soon after.

The victims were identified as Mohamed Johar Selamat and Mohd Said Abdul Majid, who were friends. Mohamed Johar, a primary school drop-out who was 33 years old at the time of his death, was a technician with an offshore oil company and the second child out of seven in his family. He was due to be married in September of that same year. Mohd Said was a 29-year-old machinist employed by a Jurong oil tools company and the third child out of a family of nine, and he formerly studied at Tun Seri Lanang Secondary School. Mohamed Johar's family stated that he had plans to go to Tanglin Halt to retrieve a Walkman from his ex-girlfriend, who was living in the flat where he was murdered, while Mohd Said's family believed he might have tagged along with Mohamed Johar.

According to 78-year-old Ahmad Saibon, who owned the flat, he was staying with his 31-year-old grandson and his two friends, one of whom was Mohamed Johar's 23-year-old ex-girlfriend (a divorcee), and the other was the divorcee's boyfriend (both of them were temporarily staying at Ahmad's house). Ahmad told police that the two deceased men had approached the boyfriend and a dispute erupted between the men, supposedly over a Walkman. Afterwards, it evolved into a stabbing spree, in which the divorcee's boyfriend used a knife to fatally stab the two men before he fled from the flat. One of the neighbours, Alice Phua, told the press that she heard a woman screaming and shouts from several men, and saw one of the victims lying outside her flat in a pool of blood. Many other neighbours also heard the two men shouting while the killer was attacking them. The killer's girlfriend was said to be tending to her ex-boyfriend Mohamed Johar's wounds while he and Mohd Said were motionless and bled profusely from the stabbing.

On 2 June 1989, the police apprehended the Tanglin Halt double killer for causing the deaths of Mohamed Johar and Mohd Said after they established his identity. The suspect, identified as a former seaman named Ithinin Kamari (aged 32), was charged with murder the following day.

== Trial of Ithinin Kamari ==
On 6 January 1992, Ithinin Kamari stood trial at the High Court for two counts of murdering Mohd Said Abdul Majid and Mohamed Johar Selamat. Ithinin was represented by R Yogendran, while the prosecution consisted of Shaifuddin Saruwan Bala Reddy and David Khoo. The trial was presided over by two judges - Judicial Commissioner Amarjeet Singh and Justice T S Sinnathuray. Ithinin initially wanted to plead guilty to both charges of murder but his request was refused, as the offence of murder carried the death penalty if found guilty, and an accused on trial was not allowed to plead guilty to any charges pertaining to the death penalty under Singaporean law.

The trial court was told that prior to the Tanglin Halt slayings, Ithinin's girlfriend, Zanaria Aziz, who had turned 25 by then, was a divorcee with a child and formerly in a relationship with one of the victim, Mohamed Johar, but she ultimately broke up with Mohamed Johar and became intimate with Ithinin thereafter. Zanaria, who was then jailed at a drug rehabilitation center for drug addiction, appeared as a witness in Ithinin's murder trial and testified that she was together with Ithinin inside the Tanglin Halt flat and spent the night with Ithinin and smoked heroin with him. Zanaria stated that when both Mohamed Johar and Mohd Said, as well as the duo's 23-year-old friend Zainuddin Sairi, confronted Ithinin, she was afraid that the trio would wallop her boyfriend due to her suspicion that Mohamed Johar was jealous of her new boyfriend. Zanaria testified that she saw Ithinin picking up a knife and she took it away from him, advising him to talk to them peacefully. Mohd Said later told Ithinin to change out of his sarong and challenged him to a fight, and the next thing Zanaria saw after Ithinin came back from the flat a second time was Ithinin stabbing Mohd Said twice before he went after Mohamed Johar and knifed him two times. An autopsy report showed that the stab wounds had penetrated the hearts and lungs of both Mohd Said and Mohamed Johar, and the severity of the wounds were such that they were sufficient in the ordinary course of nature to cause death.

Zainuddin also appeared in court to testify against Ithinin. Zainuddin said that Mohamed Johar invited him to go together with him and Mohd Said to confront Ithinin over a Walkman that Ithinin had allegedly taken from him, and he agreed to tag along with the two men. Zainuddin, who was then working as a factory maintenance worker, said that Ithinin denied Mohamed Johar's accusation about whoever had taken Zanaria's belongings. Ithinin challenged Mohamed Johar to a fight and Mohd Said also spewed abusive language in Malay prior to Ithinin coming out and stabbing them. According to Zainuddin, he told the court during the defence's cross-examination that Mohd Said had uttered "kurang ajar", which meant ill-mannered in Malay and was considered offensive. On re-examination, Zainuddin clarified that this phrase was often used among themselves whenever they met up and used drugs together.

Ithinin gave his defence on the stand. His main defence was sudden and grave provocation, and that he killed both Mohamed Johar and Mohd Said in a moment of anger and loss of self-control. Ithinin testified that when he was confronted by both Mohd Said and Mohamed Johar, he did not know that the latter was Zanaria's boyfriend and he only replied to them that he slept with Zanaria, which caused Mohamed Johar to shout expletives at him and told him to change his clothes, and Mohd Said similarly spewed the same vulgar words. After being kicked by the men after the abusive language, Ithinin became very angry and entered the flat to grab a knife, and stabbed both Mohamed Johar and Mohd Said. Overall, the defence summed up that due to the abusive language that caused Ithinin to lose his self-control and therefore led to the double murder, the defence of sudden and grave provocation should be accepted and that Ithinin should be convicted of manslaughter, which would have warranted the maximum sentence of life imprisonment or up to ten years' jail.

In rebuttal, Reddy argued that Ithinin should be convicted of murder for the Tanglin Halt slayings, citing that generally, a person in Ithinin's position would not, in the face of similar verbal abuse from the victims, have become so angered to the extent of losing self-control and killing the two men. Reddy stated that the reaction of Ithinin and his acts of stabbing Mohd Said and Mohamed Johar were overly disproportionate to the provocation given, and Ithinin clearly did not lose his self-control, based on the fact that he had the presence of mind to arm himself with a knife and even packed his belongings quickly before fleeing the scene of the crime.

On 9 January 1992, after a trial lasting three days, Justice T S Sinnathuray and Judicial Commissioner Amarjeet Singh delivered their verdict. The two judges found that Ithinin's defence of grave and sudden provocation should not stand, given that Ithinin had inflicted multiple fatal injuries onto both Mohamed Johar and Mohd Said out of anger over a small matter and he had acted out of proportion to the effect of the abusive words inflicted upon him. With regards to the verbal abuse Ithinin may have faced, the trial judges determined through the "reasonable man test" that for a person in the same position and same class of society as Ithinin, these common vulgar words would not have sufficiently or reasonably provoked a man to the extent of losing self-control and committing murder. Having rejected the defence of sudden and grave provocation, as well as finding that Ithinin had the intention to kill and/or cause the fatal wounds to Mohamed Johar and Mohd Said, the judges concluded that there were sufficient grounds to return a verdict of murder.

As a result, 35-year-old Ithinin Kamari was found guilty of both charges of murder, and sentenced to death by hanging for each count.

== Appeal ==
After he was sentenced to hang, Ithinin filed an appeal to the Court of Appeal against his murder conviction and two death sentences.

The appeal was dismissed by a panel of three appellate judges - Chief Justice Yong Pung How, Justice Warren Khoo and Justice Chao Hick Tin - in 1993. The three judges found that Ithinin had failed in his defence of sudden and grave provocation, given that he had reacted grossly out of proportion to any supposed provocation inflicted upon him by the two victims. They also stated that Ithinin had inflicted lethal wounds on the vital parts of both Johar and Mohd Said's bodies, which was not justifiable, and was excessive violence for a person acting under a grave and sudden provocation. They also found that a reasonable man belonging to the same class of society as the appellant would not have normally become so angered to the extent of resorting to murder, and as such, the Court of Appeal upheld Ithinin's conviction and sentence, and dismissed his appeal.

== Aftermath ==
After the loss of his appeal, Ithinin was hanged on an unknown date in Changi Prison.

In the aftermath of Ithinin's trial and execution, his appeal became a precedent case study with regards to the defence of sudden and grave provocation. Ithinin's case and several others were mentioned again in 1998 in light of the landmark ruling of Kwan Cin Cheng's case, which concerned the defence of sudden and grave provocation raised by Kwan, who was said to have murdered his girlfriend Phang Ai Looi after she refused to break up with another man and proclaimed she was much happier with the other man compared to Kwan. In this case, which ended with Kwan serving a life sentence for manslaughter, the Court of Appeal re-affirmed that based on the mental background of the accused and the "reasonable man test", the defence of sudden and grave provocation could still succeed if verbal remarks could result in one losing his self-control and killing the victim in a fit of uncontrollable anger, which the court accepted in Kwan's case.

Ithinin's case had an influence in several other murder cases. One of these cases was the 1999 trial of Lau Lee Peng, a fishmonger charged with murdering his friend and fruit stall helper Tan Eng Yan. Lau claimed that he killed Tan in a moment of anger and loss of self-control due to Tan insulting his mother and threatening to kill him. However, the courts found that Lau's actions, in accordance to the Ithinin case and other precedent cases, were grossly out of proportion to the provocation given and the harm he caused was in excess of any danger Tan would have posed to him. Lau was sentenced to death, and he was hanged on 1 September 2000.

The case of Ithinin was also referred to in the 2004 murder trial of Sundarti Supriyanto, who was charged with the double murder of her employer Angie Ng and Ng's daughter Crystal Poh. The trial judge M P H Rubin, who accepted Sundarti's defence of sudden and grave provocation, cited the Ithinin case and found that Sundarti, who was severely and maliciously abused and deprived of food by Ng, was indeed provoked and had lost her self-control, and therefore killed Ng and her daughter in a moment of uncontrollable rage, as a result of the frequent humiliation and cruelty she suffered from Ng's cold-blooded and relentless abuse, which would have reasonably become the straw that broke the camel's back for anyone in Sundarti's position. As a result, Sundarti was found not guilty of murder, and instead sentenced to life imprisonment for manslaughter in September 2004.

== See also ==
- Capital punishment in Singapore
