= Sers =

Sers may refer to:

- Sers, Armenia
- Sers, Charente, France
- Sers, Hautes-Pyrénées, France
- Sers, Tunisia

SERS may refer to:

- Surface enhanced Raman spectroscopy (SERS)
- Selective En bloc Redevelopment Scheme, a housing strategy in Singapore
- Pennsylvania State Employees' Retirement System (SERS), a public pension system
