= Tiong Ghee Temple =

Taoist temple in Singapore

Coordinates: 1.2910°N 103.8041°E

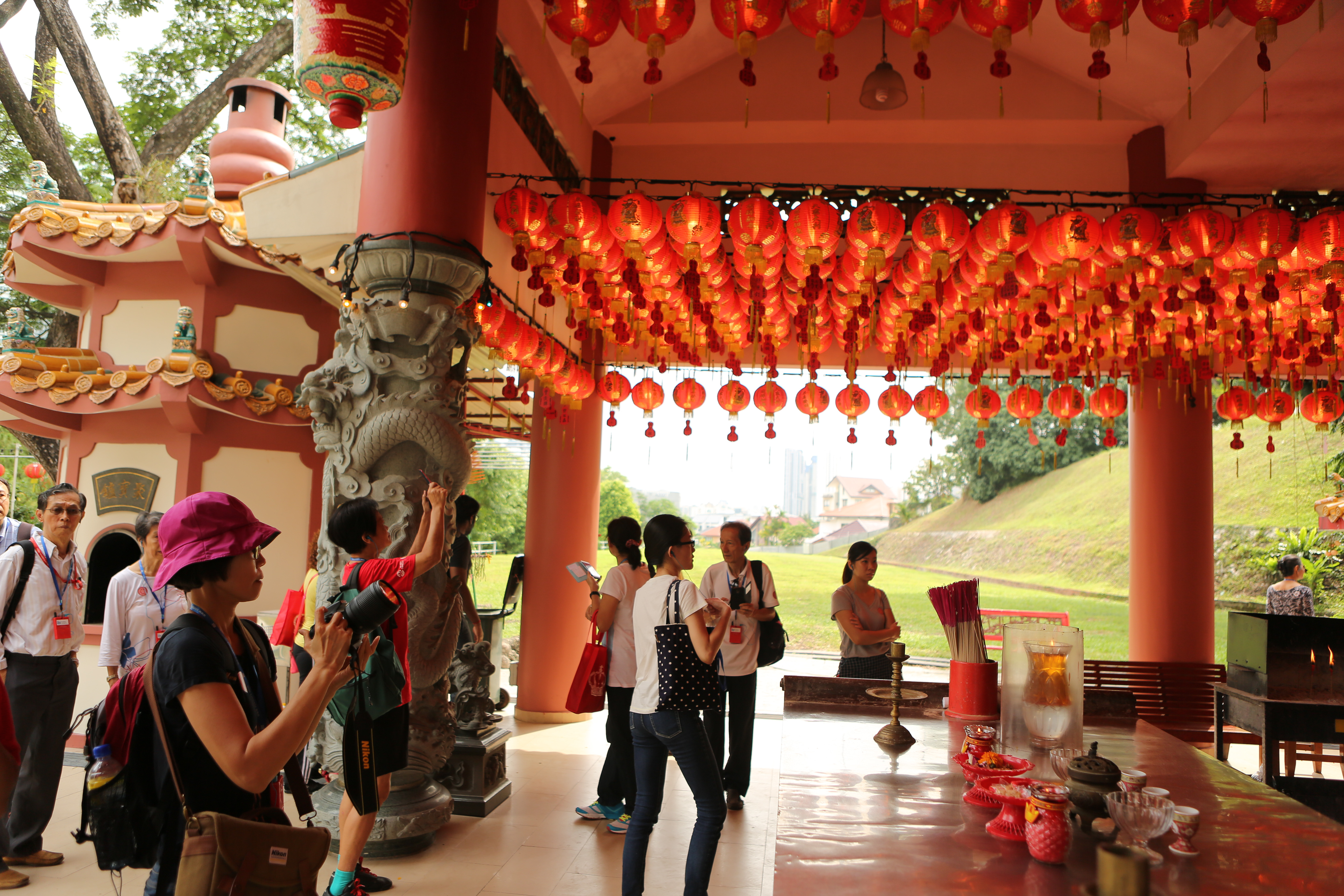
The temple in 2016

Tiong Ghee Temple is a Taoist temple on Stirling Road in Queenstown, Singapore. It is the oldest Taoist temple in Queenstown.

== History ==
The Tiong Ghee Temple was built to replace an older temple in the Boh Beh Kang village, which had been demolished in 1968 to make way for the development of the Mei Ling estate. The older temple, which was initially known as the Ghee Tiong Temple, was built on Hong Yin Hill following the end of World War II and replaced an even older temple in the village that had been converted from a storage hut in the 1930s. It was renamed the Tiong Ghee Temple in 1966. Fundraising for the newer temple began shortly after the demolition of the previous temple. It was officially opened by prominent businessman Chua Poh Tiong in 1973. The temple is dedicated to the deity Guan Gong. It still features the original altar statues. Although there had not been a Taoist medium at the temple for over a decade by 2010, the original medium's chair, spirit whip and sword are still kept at the temple.
