= Selective En bloc Redevelopment Scheme =

Singapore public housing redevelopment programme

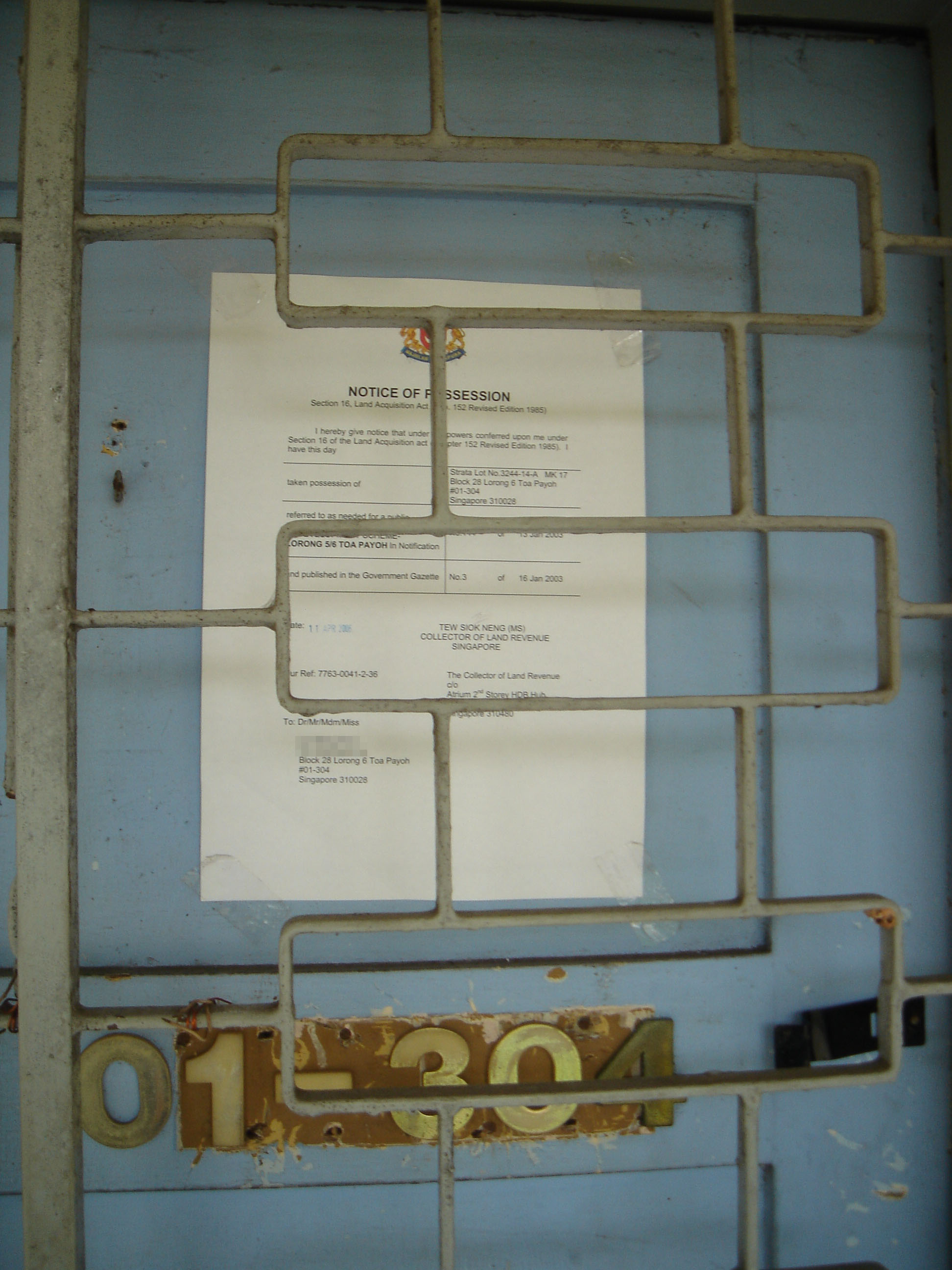
A flat stuck with the en-bloc notice.

The Selective En bloc Redevelopment Scheme (SERS) is an urban redevelopment strategy employed by the Housing and Development Board (HDB) in Singapore. Launched in August 1995, it involved the forced acquisition and redevelopment of old flats to optimise land use. All residents displaced by the redevelopment works were offered a new 99-year lease in new flats constructed nearby. These residents had the privilege to select their units prior to public release of the remaining units, were compensated financially, and were given subsidised prices for their new flats. The scheme also allowed residents to continue living near their kin and neighbours.

Some flats acquired by SERS were repurposed after they were vacated. In 2002, Neo Tiew Estate at Lim Chu Kang was taken by the Singapore Armed Forces, and has since been used as a FIBUA training facility. In April 2020, to deal with the COVID-19 pandemic in foreign worker dormitories, flats in Bukit Merah vacated in 2018 were used to house foreign workers. Three flats at MacPherson are also being used as temporary rental flats until their scheduled demolition in 2028.

By 2018, 4% of all HDB flats were identified for SERS since launch. The final SERS project was announced in April 2022, involving four flats at Ang Mo Kio. By August 2025, 80 SERS projects were completed, with another two ongoing, and no plan for additional projects.

== Voluntary Early Redevelopment Scheme ==
A new scheme to replace SERS, the Voluntary Early Redevelopment Scheme (VERS), was announced in 2018. VERS will involve a voting system by the owners of the selected flats. If the majority vote against the scheme, they will be able to continue living in their flats until their 99-year lease expires. Otherwise, residents will be rehoused to nearby new housing projects. VERS is expected to be launched in the 2030s.
