= Keramat (shrine) =

Type of shrine in the Malay Peninsula

Keramat Jawi: کرامات Makam keramat, kramat
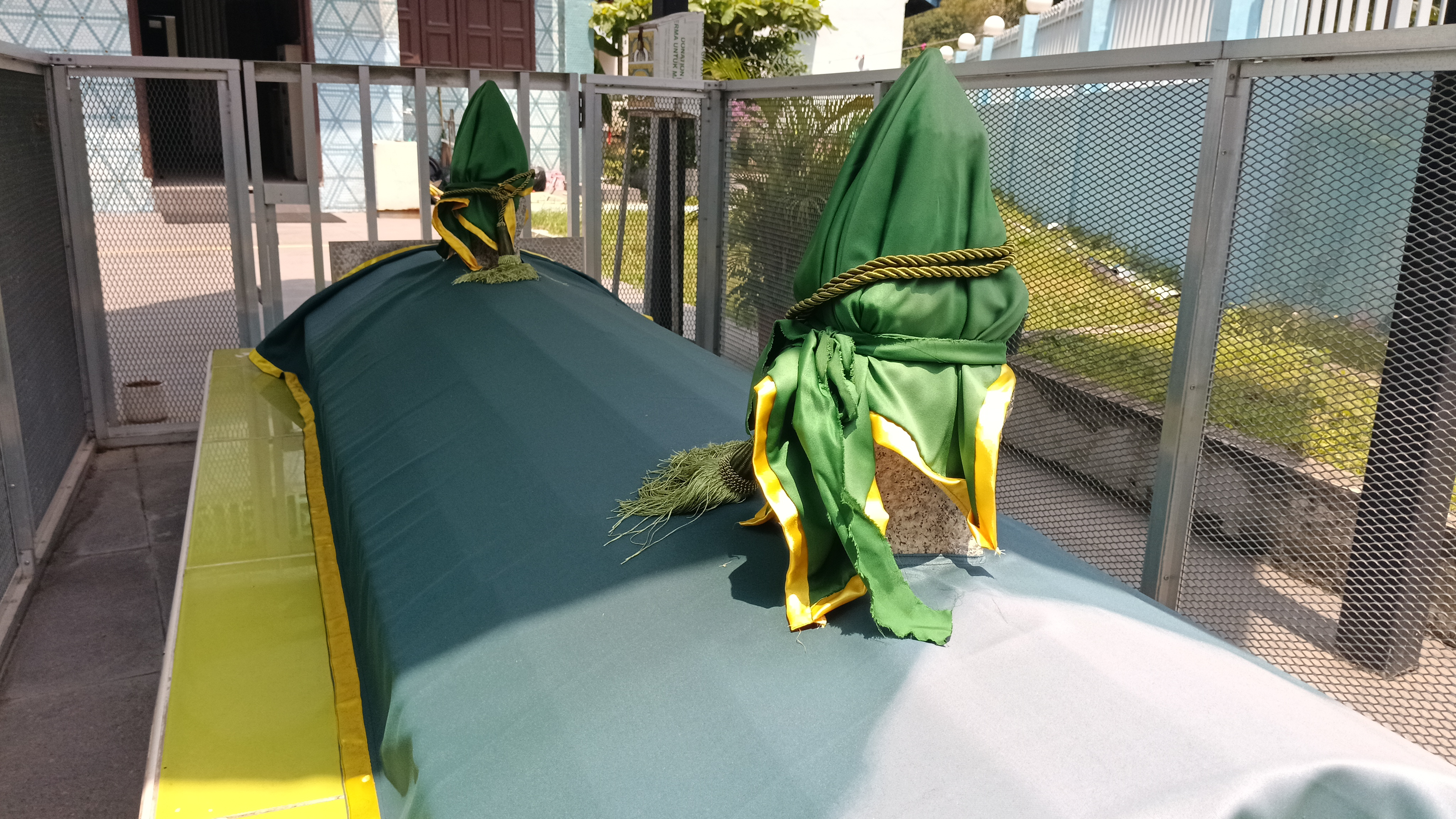
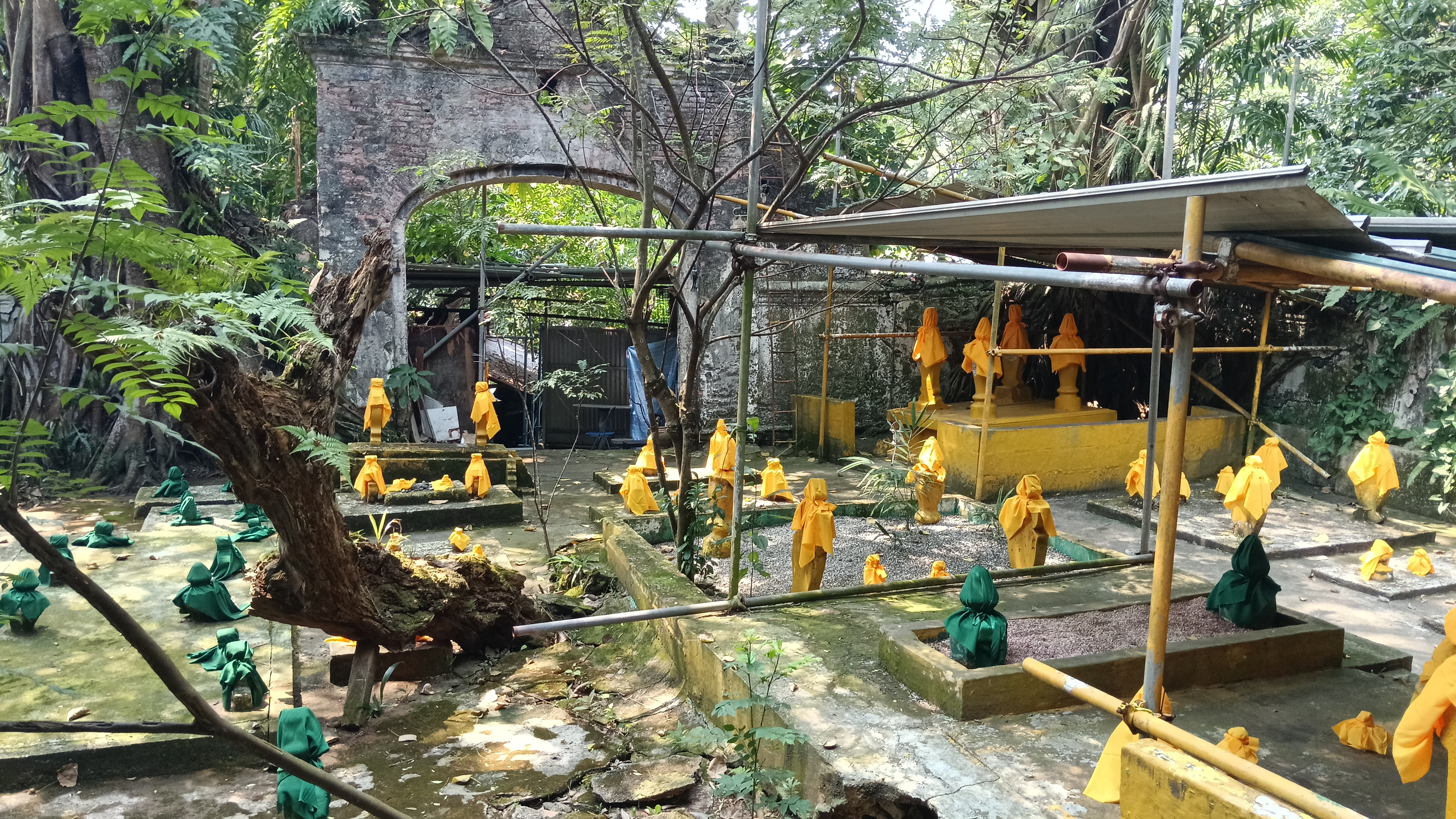
- Clockwise: A typical keramat; a shrine in Chinatown, Singapore; Keramat Bukit Kasita; an enshrined grave at Kampong Glam; two simple keramats in Indonesia

Religion
- Affiliation: Generally liberal Islam (originated in Malaysian folk religions)

Location
- Country: See below

Architecture
- Type: grave, cenotaph, shrine, sepulchre
- Style: Architecture of Malaysia
- Founder: Malay peoples

A keramat, alternatively known as kramat, is a type of shrine that has origins in the Malay Peninsula.

== History ==
=== Origins ===
Before the arrival of Islam in the early 15th century, the inhabitants of the Malay Peninsula adhered to Malaysian folk religion, with a sizeable portion following Buddhism and Hinduism. Some Malays worshipped spirits and participated in the veneration of anthills and grave sites that were believed to contain powerful spirits. After the Malays had adopted Islam as their sole religion, some of them still clung onto animistic beliefs, hence the concept of venerating the graves of Muslim nobles was introduced amongst the Malays. Shrines for such purposes became known as keramat, which means "sacred" in the Malay language.

=== Characteristics ===
A typical keramat is centred around a grave that is held in high veneration. It is hence synonymous with the dargâh, a similar kind of shrine and mausoleum that is prevalent in the Indian subcontinent. A keramat is also typically associated with a Muslim personality, such as Islamic sages, religious scholars and members of royalty. However, there are some exceptions to this rule, with some keramats being associated with Chinese or Hindu deities. Not every keramat contains a grave either; some may just be symbolic cenotaphs. The shrine can be a single grave, or it can also have a structure on top of it, which usually takes the form of a canopy decorated with a saffron drape. Some keramats can also be found inside mosques.

A person who is associated with a keramat may be known as a keramat hidup (literally, "living keramat"). One example of such a person would be Oli Chivli Kutti Mamoo, a Muslim pharmacist who was known by his title Bismillah Wali.

== Presence ==
=== Singapore ===
Keramat Habib Noh is the most prominent of the keramats in Singapore, visited in large amounts by both locals and religious tourists from places as far as China. Another prominent keramat is the Keramat Iskandar Shah, a monument situated on top of Fort Canning Hill that is believed to be the burial place of Sang Nila Utama, the semi-legendary founder of Temasek. There is also an 18th-century royal cemetery, Keramat Bukit Kasita, within the Bukit Purmei housing estate. The royal parts of the Jalan Kubor Cemetery are also considered to be a keramat. Many other shrines in Singapore that did not survive due to redevelopments in their areas have been exhumed and reinterred at the Pusara Abadi cemetery.

During colonial times, police stations in Muslim-majority areas would have a keramat within its compound that was cared for by officers and personnel of the station. Some keramats also became places for the smoking of illegal substances such as cannabis, such as the tomb of Mohammed Bakar Shah at Race Course Road.

=== Indonesia ===
Keramats in Indonesia are known as makam keramat ("sacred tomb"). They are sites of religious tourism and are mainly associated with Sunni Islamic personalities. Some of the most prominent keramats in the country are that of the Wali Sanga, a group of nine Islamic missionaries who spread Islam to Java in the 15th and 16th centuries. Some keramats belong to pre-Islamic figures, such as the tomb of Rangsemangsang that is worshipped by followers of the Kejawèn folk religion.

=== Malaysia ===
The concepts of keramats originated from what can be considered present-day Malaysia. An example of a keramat in the country is the Makam Dato Koyah at George Town, which contains a 19th-century shrine and tomb of a Muslim sage named Syed Mustapha Idris. The town of Kampung Datuk Keramat in Kuala Lumpur is named after a prominent keramat dedicated to an elderly Muslim sage.

=== Brunei ===
The Islamic council of Brunei forbids the veneration of graves, stating that such practices are sacrilegious to the Islamic faith. Some keramats are allowed to exist, such as that of Tuan Syarif, but have been stripped of their status as keramat.

=== South Africa ===
"Kramat" and "mazaar" are terms used to describe mausoleums built over the tombs of holy men in the Cape Town of South Africa. There are at least twenty-three of such shrines built around Cape Town which are regularly visited by locals and have been known as a "Circle of Tombs." Twenty of them are also national heritage sites. One of the more famous kramats in the country is that of Sheikh Yusuf, a Muslim scholar from Makassar who was exiled to Cape Town by the Dutch colonialists. This kramat, however, remains a symbolic cenotaph, as the remains of Sheikh Yusuf had been exhumed and reinterred in a separate mausoleum at Makassar in the early 18th century at the request of the Sultanate of Gowa.

== Controversies ==
=== Fake keramats ===
In Indonesia, there is a common practice of creating fake keramats, usually for profits or high public status. One example of a fake keramat was that of a grave in Pandeglang, which was created in 2025 and remained a site of visitation, until residents demolished the shrine a year later and discovered that there were no human remains present. In 2024, residents of a village in Sukabumi destroyed a cemetery that was full of fake keramat graves after discovering that the graves were used for anti-Islamic activism.

=== Religious opposition ===
In 2011, the Islamic council of Malacca ordered the demolition of a keramat on the island of Pulau Besar, due to claims of sacrilegious activities being practiced there. As of 2026, Malaysia has also taken a stance against illegal shrines that have been built without a proper permit. Meanwhile in Brunei, worshipping at a keramat is a punishable offence which can result in one being jailed for such an act.

== Notable keramats ==
=== Singaporean keramats ===
- Keramat Habib Noh
- Keramat Iskandar Shah
- Keramat Bukit Kasita
- Keramats in the compound of Kubur Kassim
- Mausoleum of Radin Mas Ayu

=== Indonesian keramats ===
- Makam Keramat Tujuh
- Shrine of Datuk Shaykh al-Azhar
- Mausoleum of Surgi Mufti

=== Kramats of Cape Town ===
- Kramats in the Tana Baru Cemetery

== See also ==
- Maqam (shrine)
