= Rumah Warisan Haji Su =

Rumah Warisan Haji Su رومه واريثن حاج سو
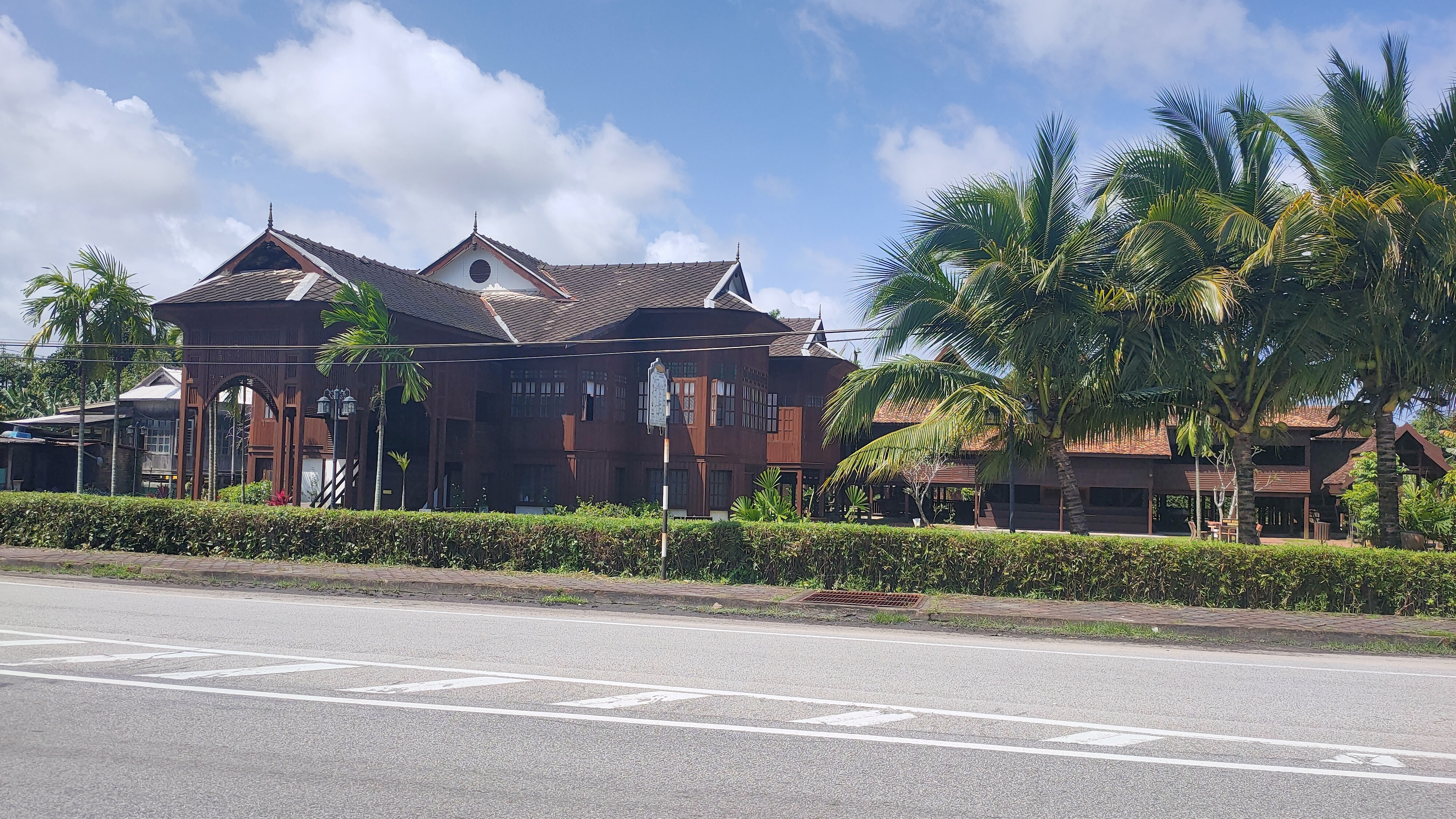
- Interactive map of the Rumah Warisan Haji Su رومه واريثن حاج سو area

General information
- Type: Residence
- Architectural style: Traditional Malay
- Location: Lot 7181, Kampung Losong Haji Su, 21000, Kuala Terengganu, Terengganu., Losong, Kuala Terengganu, Terengganu, Malaysia
- Coordinates: 5°19′08″N 103°07′29″E
- Construction started: 1850s; 1940s
- Owner: Lembaga Muzium Terengganu

Rumah Warisan Haji Su (English translation: Haji Su Heritage House) is a complex of two traditional Malay houses located in mukim Losong, two kilometres from downtown Kuala Terengganu, Terengganu. The houses were owned by Haji Su Mohammed Salleh, which he inherited from his family. Haji Su was a shipping magnate in the pre-wars day and was record to have owned several ships or Perahu Besar plying the sea to Southern Thailand and a steam ship plying south to Singapore. After a renovation process by Lembaga Muzium Terengganu (Terengganu Museum Board), the houses were reopened as heritage buildings and tourist attraction.

== Design ==
The complex is located on a 0.4841-hectare (1.196-acre) site and consists of two distinct houses that were built at different times. Both houses were built using timber that withstood the climate of the area. The older house was constructed in the 1850s and used the Rumah Bujang Berpeleh Kembar Tiga style, as can be dominantly seen on its roof. The three peleh or gables located on top was uncommon as usually, a house would only have one, this design signified the wealth of the family. This building was used as a family home and mostly made with chengal, a type of local hardwood. The house was constructed by using the system of tanggam and pasak, a traditional structural connection in which no nails are used. The main staircase of house has a larger riser and thread that act like a seating for panggung (amphitheater) than stairs. This could be attributed to the owner being a proponent and troupe leader of Dikir Pahang.

The newer house, known as Rumah Limas Belanda, was added later in 1941. It was mostly used for guests and festivities. This house has a more modern Dutch hip roof, and was built through a balloon-frame construction method. The interior design is also more vibrant when compared with other traditional Malay house.

Due to Haji Su's experience as a sailor and trader, the houses are also influenced by foreign designs. For example, the carvings on the upper sections resemble those of the old palaces and forts of Jaipur, India. A unique feature of one of the houses is the 70 windows and 12 large doors to ensure proper ventilation. The upper parts of the windows are attached with glasses so that light can shine through.

== History ==
The houses used to be the residence of Haji Su Mohammed Salleh Mohammed, a Terengganuan millionaire. Known as Haji Su by the locals, he was a community figure in the 1800s, and his name was immortalised in the name of a village in Losong, Kg. Losong Haji Su. The houses were subsequently inherited to his descendants but fell into disrepair and neglect after the death of the last child of Haji Su in 2008. Lembaga Muzium Terengganu bought the buildings for RM3.2 million to preserve the architectural heritage and traditional Malay workmanship. After renovation and upgrades, the houses are now opened to the public for visits.
