= Mausoleum of Dato Koyah =

Mausoleum of Dato Koyah Makam Dato Koyah Nádū Gēyǎ Shèngdiàn (拿督哥雅圣殿)
- Location in Malaysia

Religion
- Affiliation: Sunni Islam

Location
- Location: Makam Dato Koyah, 10050 George Town, Penang, Malaysia
- Country: Malaysia
- Coordinates: 5.4204527°N 100.3306967°E

Architecture
- Type: Mausoleum
- Style: South Indian architecture
- Completed: c. 1840
- Minaret: 4
- Designated as NHL: Category I Heritage Site

The Mausoleum of Dato Koyah is a 19th-century mausoleum and shrine located in George Town, Penang.

== History ==
The mausoleum was built in the 1840s over the grave of Syed Mustapha Idris, a prominent Indian Muslim sage and mystic who was well-known amongst locals for his title Dato Koyah. The land that the grave and its mausoleum later stood on in George Town were donated by the British colonial government. Along with the Nagore Durgha Sheriff, the mausoleum was enshrined and revered by the local Indian Muslim community of George Town, Penang. The tomb of Dato Koyah was also known to Malays as a keramat. After the withdrawal of British forces from Penang in 1957, ownership of both the mausoleum and the land it occupied were taken by the local Islamic council and then reestablished as an awqaf.

Due to the mausoleum's status as a Category I heritage site of Penang, a renovation project began in 2015 to rehabilitate the structure, which had fallen into a state of dilapidation. This extensive renovation project was ultimately completed by 2018. Important aspects of the shrine's exterior, such as the towers and gateway, were preserved along with other 19th-century South Indian architectural features of the original shrine.

== See also ==
- Nagore Durgha Sheriff
