= Keramat Iskandar Shah =

Monument at Fort Canning Hill, Singapore

Keramat Iskandar Shah كرامت إسكندر شاه Yī Sī Gān Dá Shā Shèng Líng (伊斯干达沙圣陵)

- Location in Singapore

Religion
- Affiliation: Sunni Islam

Location
- Location: Lewin Terrace, Fort Canning Hill, Singapore 179037
- Country: Singapore
- Coordinates: 1.2942851°N 103.8473161°E

Architecture
- Type: Monument
- Style: Malaccan architecture
- Completed: 1990

Keramat Iskandar Shah is a monument located on Fort Canning Hill in Singapore. Local tradition attributes it as the burial place of a semi-legendary ruler, Iskandar Shah. The present structure was built in 1990 and is a tourist attraction.

== History ==
A shrine over the purported tomb of a Malay ruler, Iskandar Shah, was erected before 1819 on a flatland at Fort Canning Hill. This shrine, Keramat Iskandar Shah, was visited by British resident John Crawford in 1822, who described the shrine as being a "rude structure" visited by both the local Hindu and Malay communities. Stamford Raffles, upon visiting Fort Canning Hill two years earlier, ordered the removal of the Keramat Iskandar Shah due to its dilapidated state, although the tomb would remain untouched. In 1922, the Mohammedan Advisory Board permitted a request to exhume the tomb, but the project was cancelled after the authorities were unable to find a contractor to begin the exhumation. During the Second World War, Japanese forces occupied the buildings on the hill but did not damage the shrine out of superstition, believing that the area was haunted by poltergeists.

By 1975, Keramat Iskandar Shah had become a popular tourist attraction of Fort Canning Hill. In 1985, it was announced that the shrine would be preserved and included as part of a historical zone in the development of a new park atop the hill. Keramat Iskandar Shah was completely rebuilt from the ground up in 1990, featuring a new wooden structure designed by Malaccan craftsmen.

Since its reconstruction in 1990, Keramat Iskandar Shah had lost its status as a religious shrine and now merely serves as a monument and tourist attraction. Archaeological excavations conducted around the structure by archaeologist John Miksic in 1984 have uncovered rusty coins as well as shards of porcelain and earthenware that date back to the 14th century and are of Chinese origin.

=== Historicity ===
The cenotaph marking the purported grave of Iskandar Shah.

Keramat Iskandar Shah is traditionally believed by locals to be the burial place of Parameswara, the last Raja of Temasek and the first Sultan of Malacca who adopted the title of Sri Sultan Iskandar Shah as a throne name. However, the tombs of Parameswara and his descendants are situated in Malacca, invalidating the claim that Keramat Iskandar Shah is where Parameswara is buried. Furthermore, there is a third shrine attributed to Sri Sultan Iskandar Shah at Keramat Bukit Kasita in Bukit Purmei, although later traditions described the Iskandar Shah buried there as having been a contemporary of Stamford Raffles and lived in the 19th century.

Alternative theories put forward by local historians state that Keramat Iskandar Shah may have instead been the burial place of the semi-legendary founder of Temasek, Sang Nila Utama. It has also been claimed by locals that the site is the original Tomb of Alexander the Great (due to "Iskandar Shah" being an Arabic version of "King Alexander") although this claim was later disproven by Malay historian Buyong Adil. Contemporary Sufi mystic and caretaker of Duxton Plain Park, Ahmad Ridhwan al-Habsyi, stated that the shrine was the burial place of a Meccan Islamic scholar by the name of Sheikh Ismail. However, there is no evidence for Ahmad Ridhwan's claim as well.

== Architecture ==
Keramat Iskandar Shah takes the form of a pavilion with a tiered roof, with wood being predominately used in its construction, while twenty wooden pillars that are arranged in five rows of four act as support beams to hold up the structure. The cenotaph marking the grave of Iskandar Shah stands in the centre of the wooden floor and has a rectangular, box-like shape, with a crescent-and-star emblem painted on either side of the cenotaph. The shrine is also situated on an elevated platform and is surrounded by the greenery of Fort Canning Hill.

== Transportation ==
Keramat Iskandar Shah is accessible from the Fort Canning MRT station on the Downtown Line.
