= Makam Keramat Tujuh =

Historic Islamic funerary complex in Ketapang, West Kalimantan, Indonesia

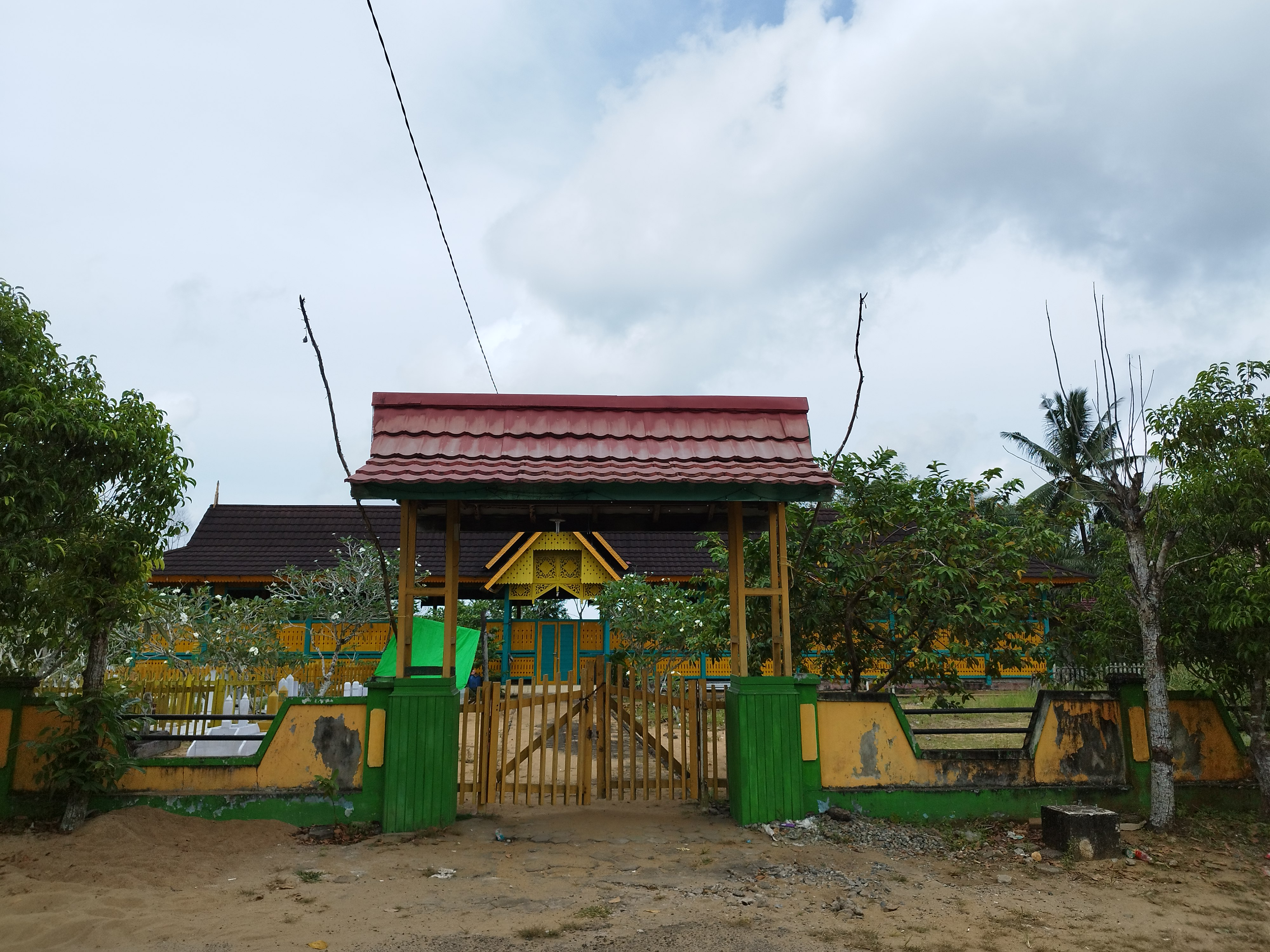
- Entrance to the complex

- Location within Indonesia

Religion
- Affiliation: Islam
- District: Benua Kayong
- Province: West Kalimantan

Location
- Location: Mulia Kerta, Indonesia
- Municipality: Ketapang Regency
- Coordinates: 1.8503378°S 109.9932068°E

The Makam Keramat Tujuh, also known as the Kompleks Makam Keramat Tujuh (lit. 'Seven Sacred Tombs Complex'), is a historic Islamic funerary and religious complex located on Jalan Pangeran Kusuma Jaya in the Kelurahan of Mulia Kerta, Benua Kayong, Ketapang Regency, West Kalimantan, Indonesia. The complex is registered as a Situs Cagar Budaya (Cultural Heritage Site) under Indonesian heritage law.

The complex served as a burial ground for religious figures who propagated Islam in West Kalimantan in the 14th century, and subsequently for relatives of the rulers of the Matan Sultanate (Kesultanan Matan), the oldest Islamic kingdom in West Kalimantan. The site remains a place of ziyārat (Islamic devotional visiting of graves), drawing pilgrims and researchers from Indonesia and abroad.

== History ==
Seven Muslim tombs were originally discovered at the site. They are associated with religious men missionaries or scholars who propagated Islam in West Kalimantan during the 14th century. Archaeological evidence at Ketapang indicates that Islam had taken hold in the region by the 14th century, as confirmed by ancient Javanese script inscriptions on the tombstones dated to 1437 CE.

The current gravestones in the two mausoleums date to the 15th century. The site also contains burials of relatives of the Matan Sultanate, whose former palace once stood nearby in what is now central Ketapang Regency. The complex continues to be visited by pilgrims and researchers from Indonesia, Germany, the United States, Singapore, Malaysia, and Brunei Darussalam.

== Construction and layout ==
The complex covers a total land area of 3,493.5 m^{2} and is set within a larger Muslim cemetery. It comprises two roofed mausoleums (cungkup) and the surrounding graveyard.

=== Larger mausoleum ===
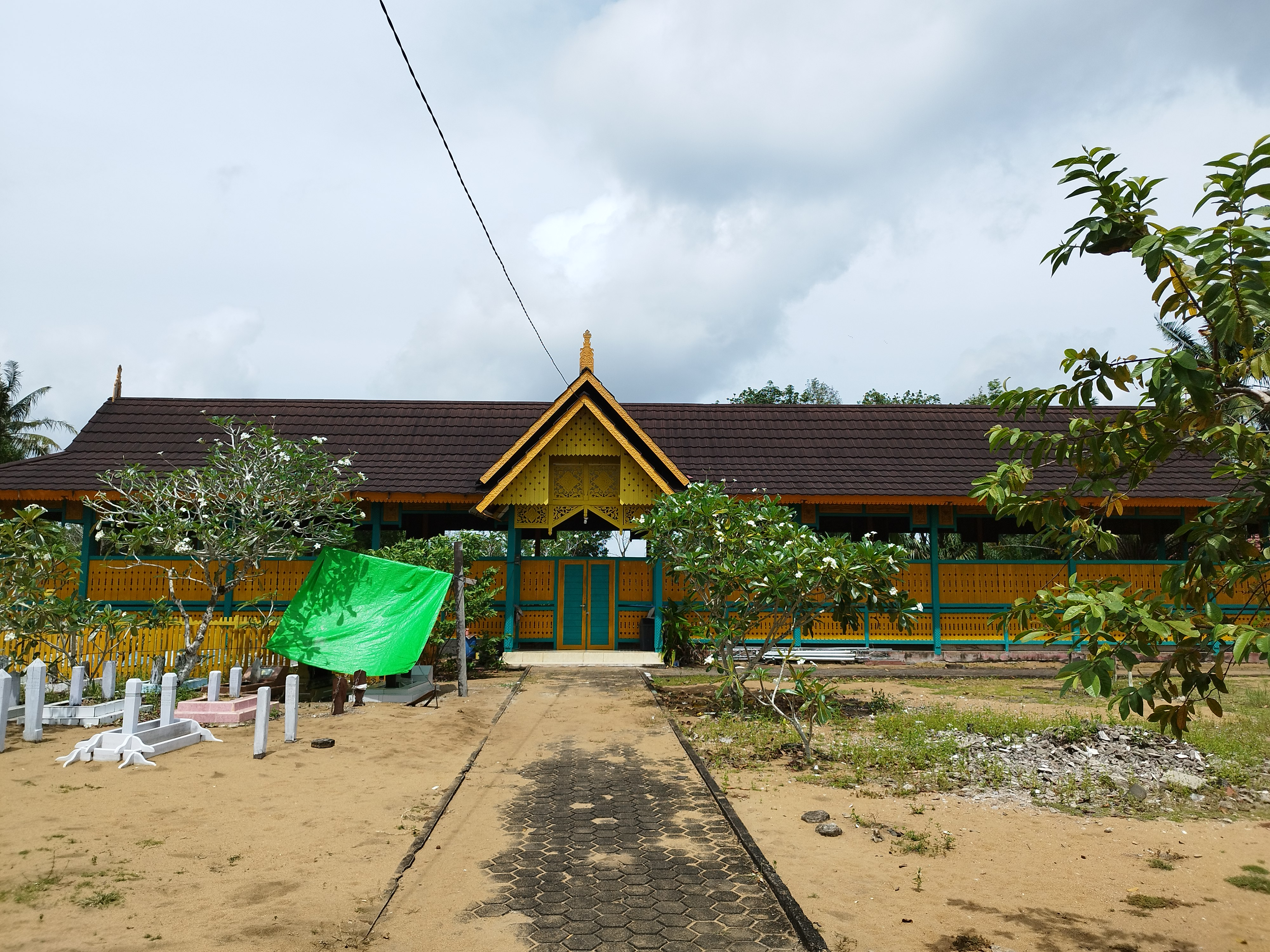
The larger mausoleum in the complex

The larger mausoleum measures 30 metres in length and 8 metres in width (240 m^{2}) and contains five tombs. The tombstones are flat slabs (nisan pipih) of carved andesite and bear a variety of inscriptions and decorative motifs:

Tomb	Description	Date (Saka / CE)
Tomb 1	Flat andesite slab with Quranic calligraphy: kullu nafsin dhā'iqatu l-mawt (Every soul shall taste death, Quran 3:185); ancient Javanese script inscription below	1263 Saka / 1441 CE
Tomb 2	Flat andesite slab, plain (no carvings)	—
Tomb 3	Flat andesite slab with calligraphy: kullu nafsin dhā'iqatu l-mawt; ancient Javanese script inscription	1359 Saka / 1437 CE
Tomb 4	Flat five-tiered andesite slab, plain	—
Tomb 5	Flat andesite slab with carved scrollwork (sulur) and lotus flower motifs	—

=== Smaller mausoleum ===
The smaller mausoleum is 48 m^{2} in area and contains two tombs, both of carved andesite:

Tomb	Description	Date (Saka calendar)
Tomb 6	Flat andesite slab with geometric bracket carvings; inscribed with a year in the Balinese saka calendar	1365 Saka
Tomb 7	Flat andesite slab, plain (no carvings)	—

== Significance ==
The Makam Keramat Tujuh is considered one of the most important pieces of archaeological evidence for the early history of Islam in Ketapang and West Kalimantan. The presence of ancient Javanese script (aksara Jawa kuno) on the tombstones, combined with the Saka calendar dates, demonstrates connections between West Kalimantan's early Islamic community and Javanese cultural traditions of the 14th and 15th centuries. The Quranic verse kullu nafsin dhā'iqatu l-mawt inscribed on two of the tombs is noted by researchers as evidence that Quranic literacy and Islamic burial rites were established in the region at that time.

== Gallery ==
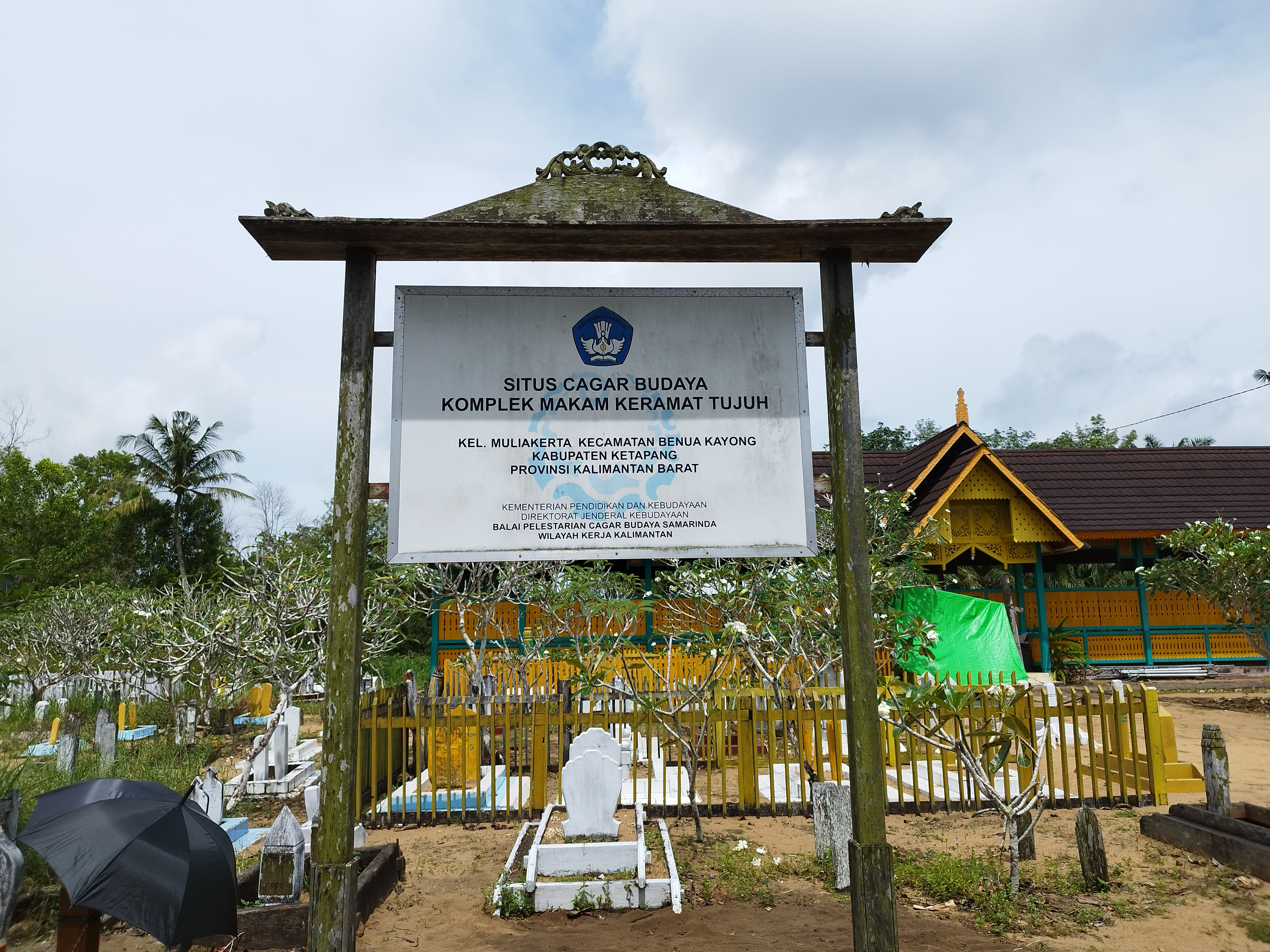
Signboard outside the complex

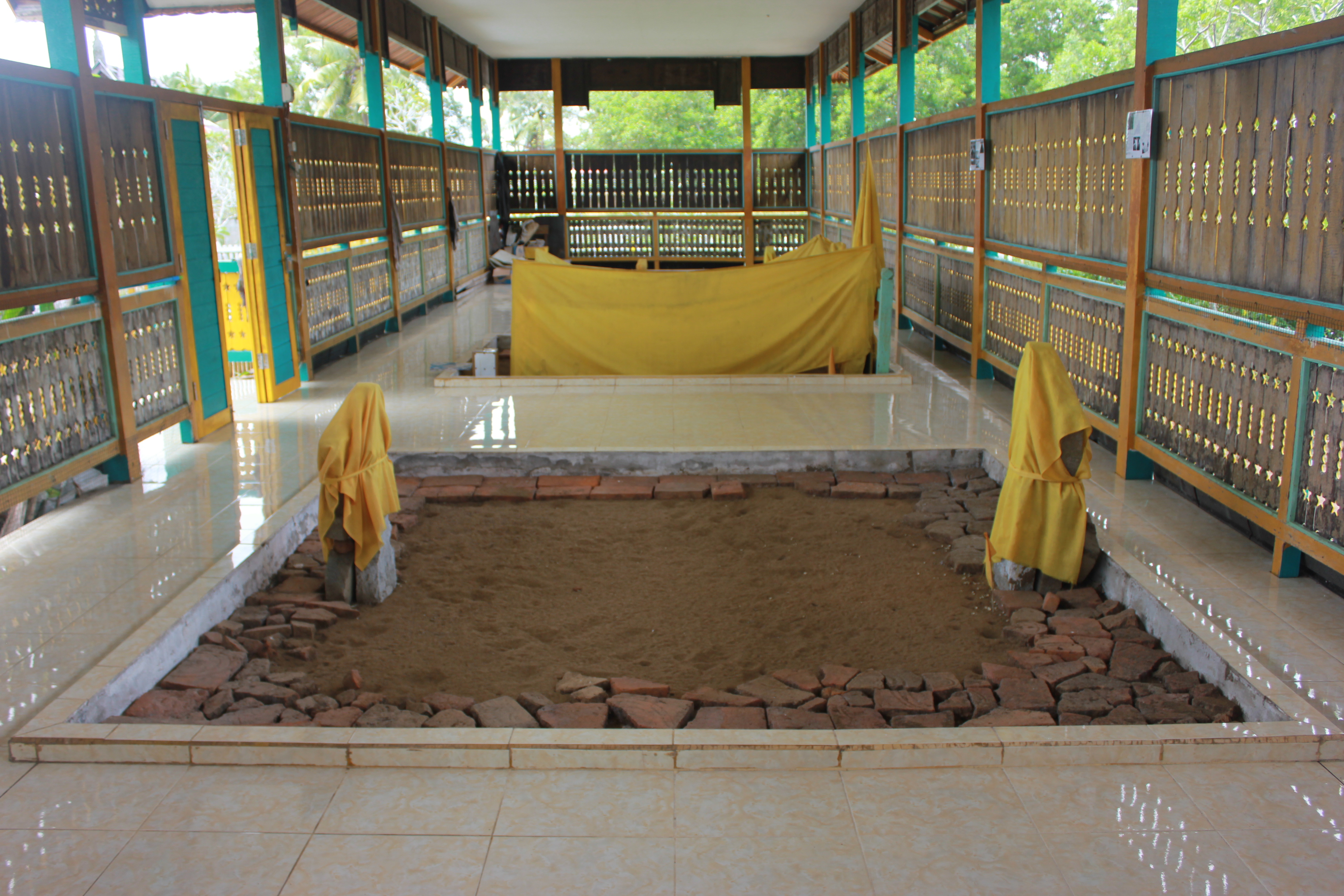
Inside the larger mausoleum, with three tombs present from this view

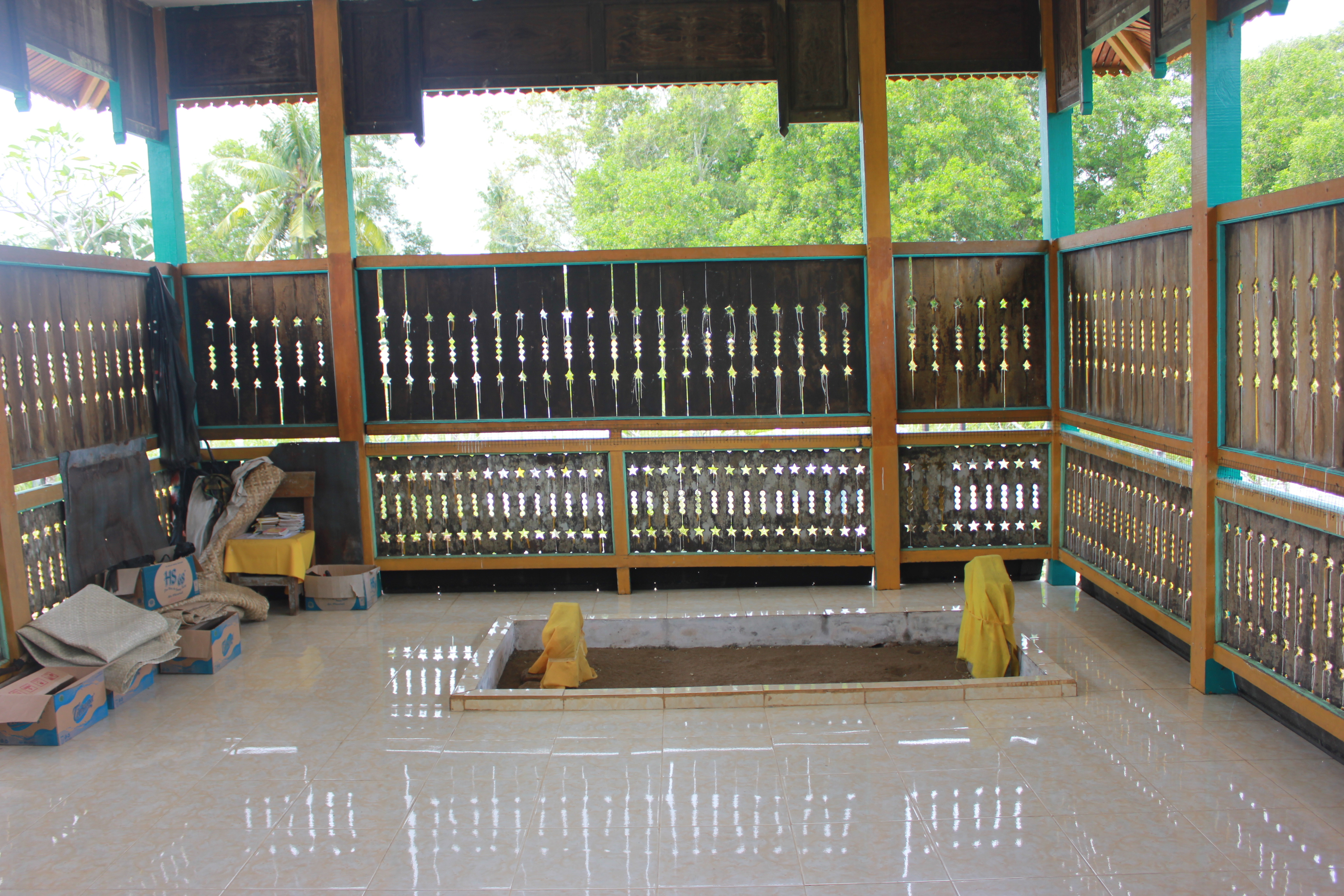
A tomb at the far end of the larger mausoleum

== See also ==
- Matan Sultanate
- Ketapang Regency
- Islam in Indonesia
- Spread of Islam in Southeast Asia
