= Architecture of Malaysia =

Architecture in Malaysia traditionally consist of malay vernacular architecture. Though modern contemporary architecture is prevalent in urban areas there are style influences from Islamic, colonial architecture, chinese straits etc. New materials, such as glasses and nails, were brought in by Europeans, changing the architecture.

Houses in the region are built for tropical conditions, raised on stilts with high roofs and large windows, allowing air to flow through the house and cool it down. Wood has been the main building material for much of Malaysia's history; it is used for everything from the simple kampung to royal palaces. In Negeri Sembilan traditional houses are entirely free of nails. Besides wood, other common materials such as bamboo and leaves were used. The Istana Kenangan in Kuala Kangsar was built in 1926, and it the only Malay palace with bamboo walls. The Orang Asal of East Malaysia live in longhouses and water villages. Longhouses are elevated and on stilts, and can house 20 to 100 families. Water villages are also built on stilts, with houses connected with planks and most transport by boats.

== Architectural influences ==
Until recent time, wood was the principal material used for all Malaysian traditional buildings. However, numerous stone structures were also discovered particularly the religious complexes from the time of ancient Malay kingdoms. Throughout many decades, the traditional Malaysian architecture has been influenced by Buginese and Javanese from the south, Islamic, Siamese, and Indian from the north, Portuguese, Dutch, British, Acehnese and Minangkabau from the west and southern Chinese from the east.

=== Ancient ===
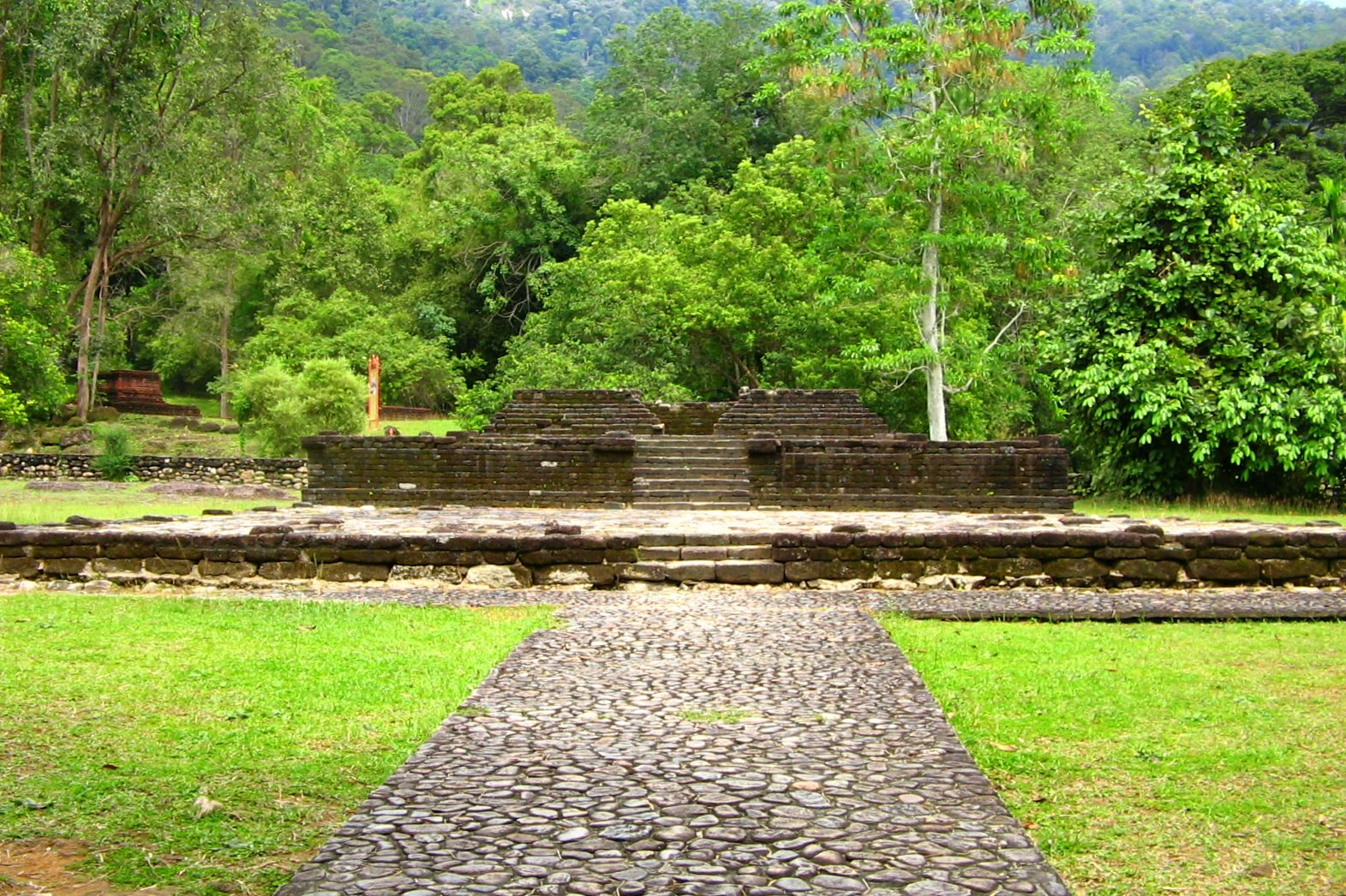
The remains of an ancient temple in Bujang Valley, Kedah, believed to be the earliest civilisation in the region.

The evidence of candi (pantheon) around south Kedah between the mount Jerai and the Muda valley, a sprawling historical complex known as Bujang Valley served as a reminder of Malaysian pre-Islamic art. Within an area of about 350 square kilometres, 87 early historic religious sites have been reported and there are 12 candis located on mountain tops, a feature which suggests may derive from pre-Islamic Malay beliefs regarding the sanctity of high places.

An early reference to Malaysian architecture can be found in several Chinese records. A 7th-century Chinese account tells of Buddhist pilgrims calling at Langkasuka and mentioned the city as being surrounded by a wall on which towers had been built and was approached through double gates. Another 7th-century account of a special Chinese envoy to Red Earth kingdom in West Malaysia, recorded that the capital city had three gates more than a hundred paces apart, which were decorated with paintings of Buddhist themes and female spirits.

=== Classical ===
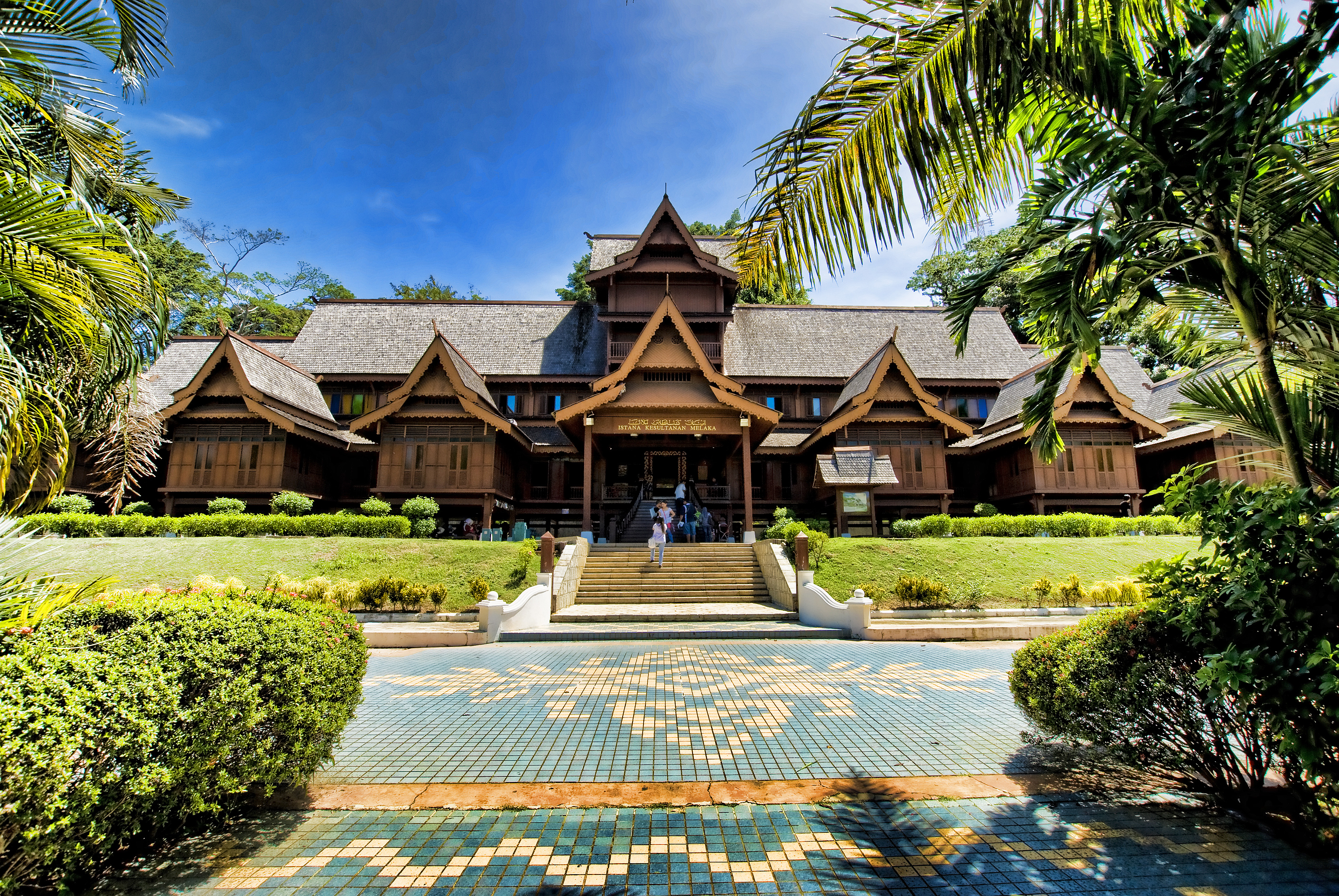
Modern replica of the 15th century Malacca palace.

The first detailed description of Malay architecture was on the great wooden palace of Mansur Shah of Malacca (reigned 1458–1477). The Sejarah Melayu (Malay Annals) had references to the construction and the architecture of Malacca's palaces. According to this historical document, the building had a raised seven-bay structures on wooden pillars with a seven-tiered roof in cooper shingles and decorated with gilded spires and Chinese glass mirrors.

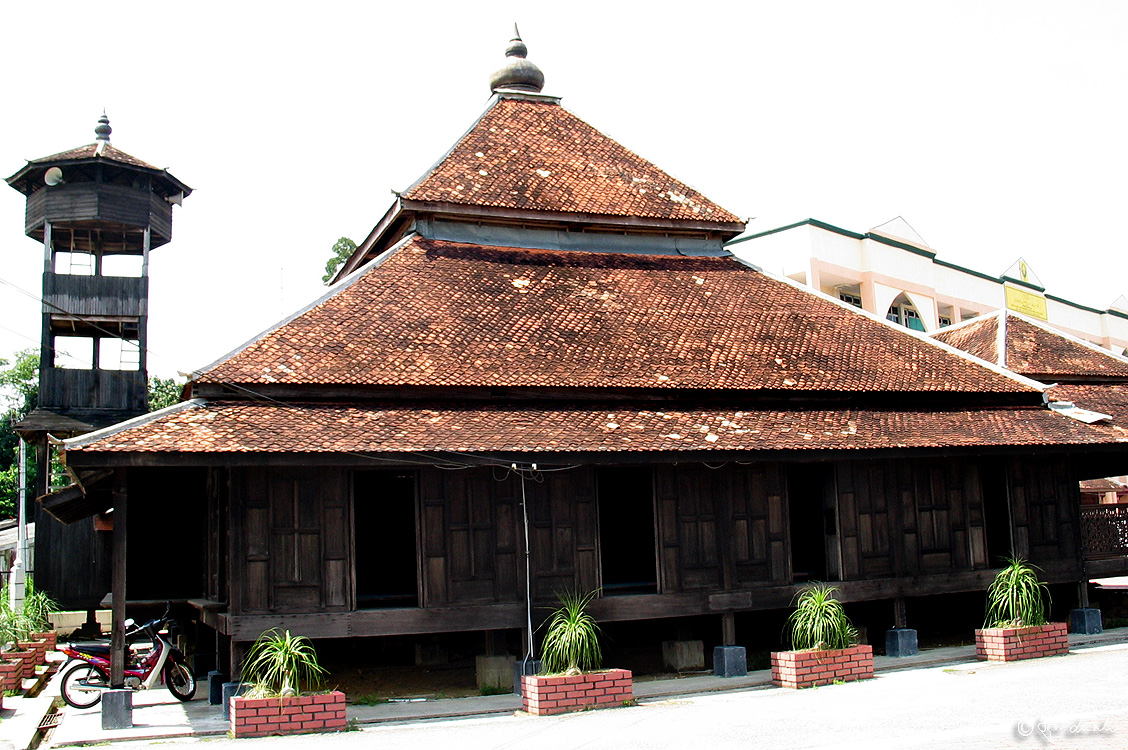
The traditional Malay architecture of Masjid Kampung Laut in Kelantan, believed to be the oldest surviving mosque in Malaysia.

The traditional Malay houses are built using simple timber-frame structure. They have pitched roofs, porches in the front, high ceilings, many openings on the walls for ventilation, and are often embellished with elaborate wood carvings. The beauty and quality of Malay wood carvings were meant to serve as visual indicators of the social rank and status of the owners themselves. With the migration of Acehnese, Minangkabau, Javanese, Banjarese and Buginese, regional Malay architectural style with influences from other parts of the archipelago also exists, especially in places where they formed the majority.

The shapes and sizes of houses differ from state to state. Common elements in Peninsular Malaysia include pitched roofs, verandahs, and high ceilings, raised on stilts for ventilation. The woodwork in the house is often intricately carved. The floors are at different levels depending on the function of the room. Mosques have traditionally been based on Javanese architecture.

=== Chinese ===
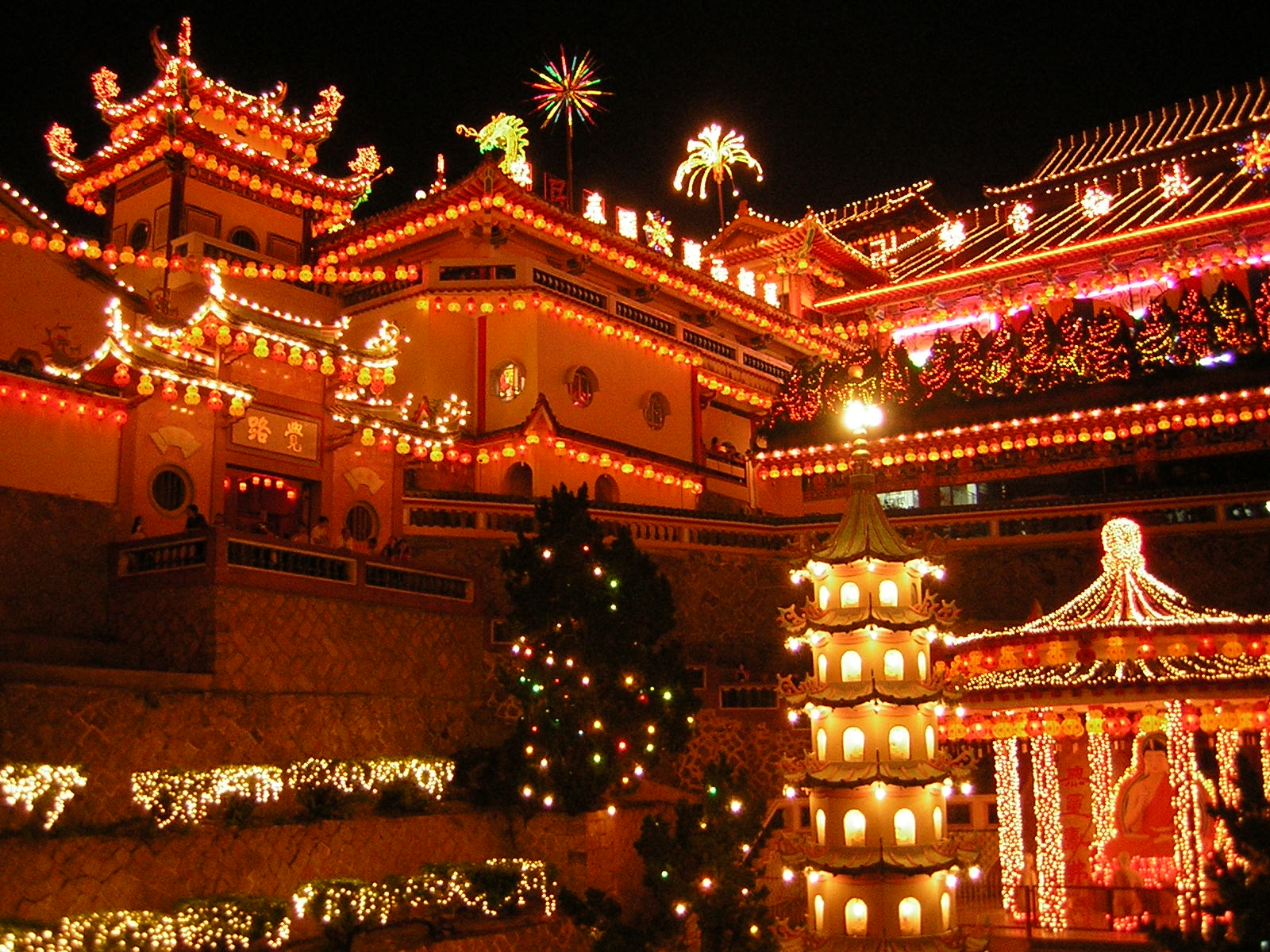
South-East Asia's Largest Temple- Kek Lok Si in Penang being illuminated in preparation for the Lunar New Year.

Chinese architecture can be divided into two types, traditional and Baba Nyonya. Baba Nyonya households are made of colourful tiles and have large indoor courtyards. Indian architecture came with the Malaysian Indians, reflecting the architecture of southern India where most originated from. Some Sikh architecture was also imported. Malacca, which was a traditional centre of trade, has a large variety of building styles. Large wooden structures such as the Palace of Sultan Mansur Shah exist from early periods. Chinese influence can be seen in brightly decorated temples and terraced shop houses. The largest remaining Portuguese structure in Malacca is the A Famosa fort. Other colonial building include the Dutch Stadthuys, the Dutch Colonial town brick buildings, and buildings built by the British such as the Memorial Hall, which combines Baroque and Islamic architecture.

=== Bornean ===
Many indigenous people of Borneo, the Dayak and Kadazandusun, live in buildings known as longhouses. Commonly, the longhouses are built raised off the ground on stilts similar to the Malay houses but are divided into a more or less public area along one side and a row of private living quarters lined along the other side. The entire architecture is designed and built as a standing tree with branches to the right and left with the front part facing the sunrise while the back faces the sunset. The longhouse building acts as the normal accommodation and a house of worship for religious activities.

In some parts of Sabah and Labuan, a substantial number of indigenous people like the Bajau and Bruneian Malay still remain to live in water villages. These water villages are also built on stilts, with houses connected with planks and most transport by traditional boats. The floating of rubbish and sewage on the water is still a persisting issue in many of these villages despite substantial measures and initiatives taken by various government and non-government agencies.

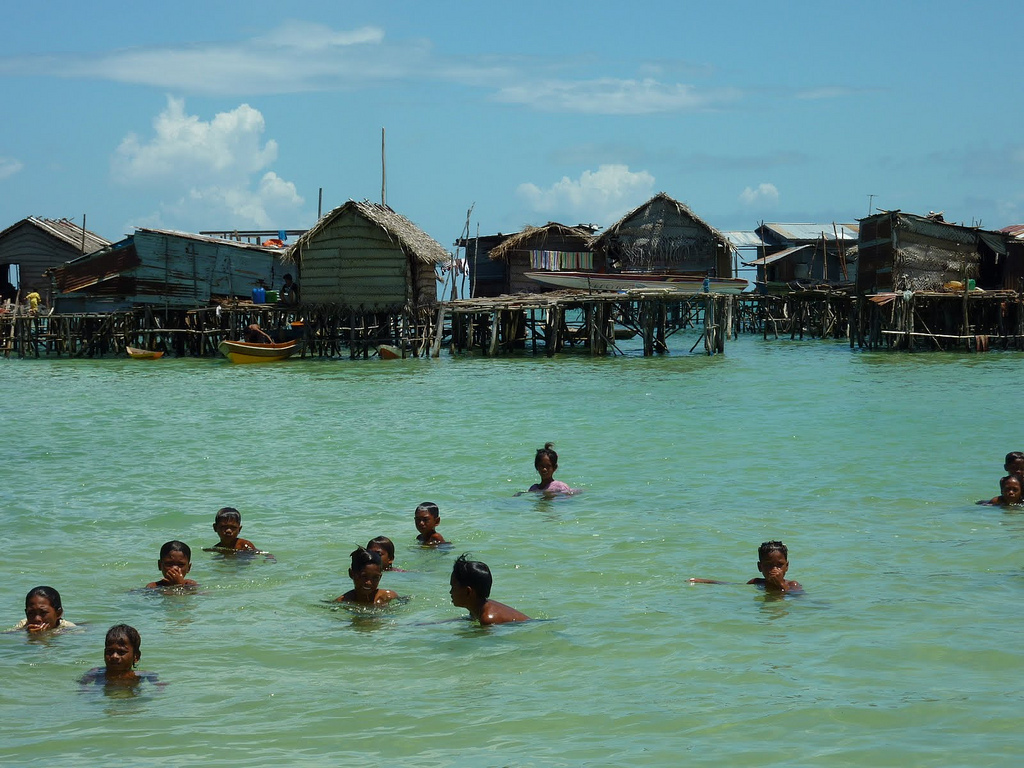
A Bajau water village near Omadal Island, Sabah.

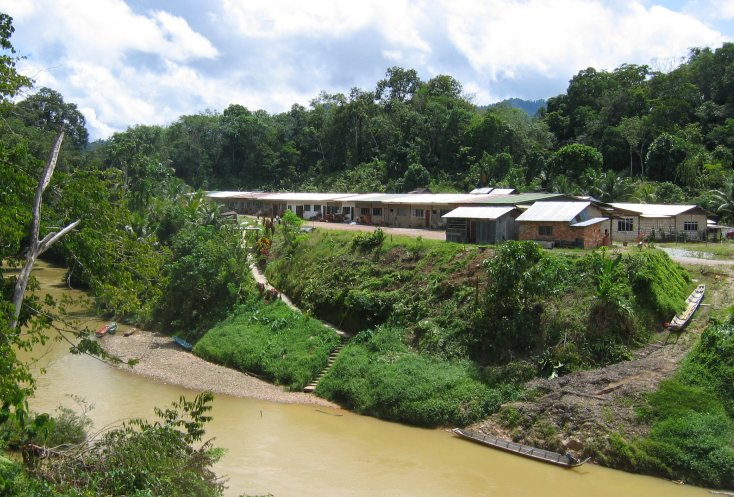
A modern Iban longhouse in Kapit Division, Sarawak.

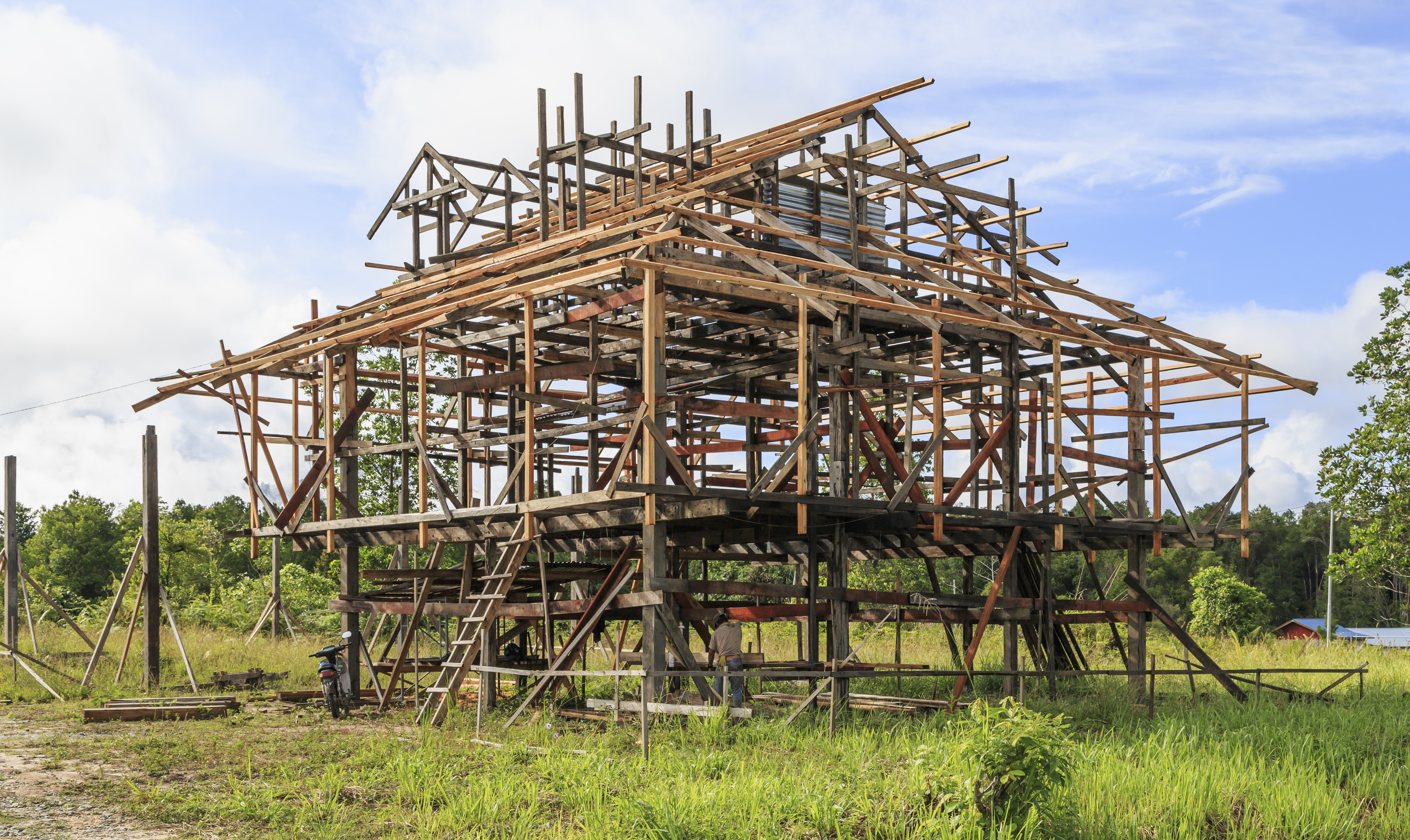
A traditional house being built in Sabah.

=== Colonial ===
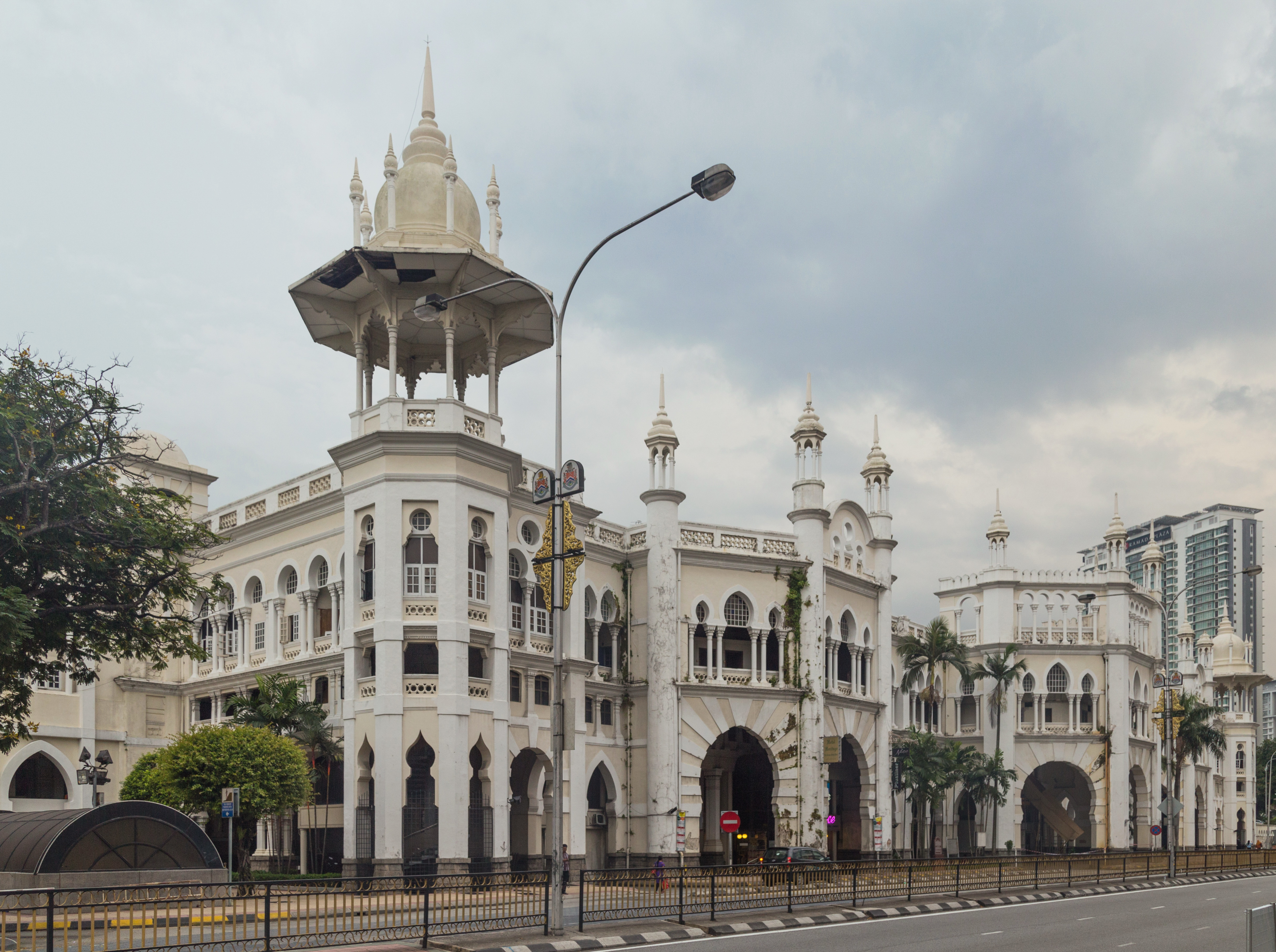
The Kuala Lumpur Railway Station, adopts a mixture of eastern and western designs. This current facade dates to 1910.

Most of Malaysia's colonial buildings were built toward the end of the 19th and early 20th centuries. These buildings have Mughal, Tudor Revival, Gothic Revival or Straits Eclectic style of architecture. Most of the styling has been modified to cater to the use of local resources and acclimatised to the local Malaysian climate, which is hot and humid all year round. Buildings with Mughal, Tudor Revival and Gothic Revival style of architecture were built by the colonial power, the British while the Chinese influenced Straits eclectic styles are common in many urban centres around Malaysia where Chinese settlers lived.

Malacca, which was a traditional centre of trade in the region, has a large variety of building styles, ranging from Islamic and Chinese styles to those brought by European colonists (Portuguese, Dutch, British). Along with Malacca, Penang is also considered one of the architectural gems of Malaysia. With its colonial-style government buildings, churches, squares, fortifications, and multicultural heritage, both Malacca and George Town demonstrate a unique architectural and cultural townscape without parallel anywhere in East and Southeast Asia.

=== Modern ===
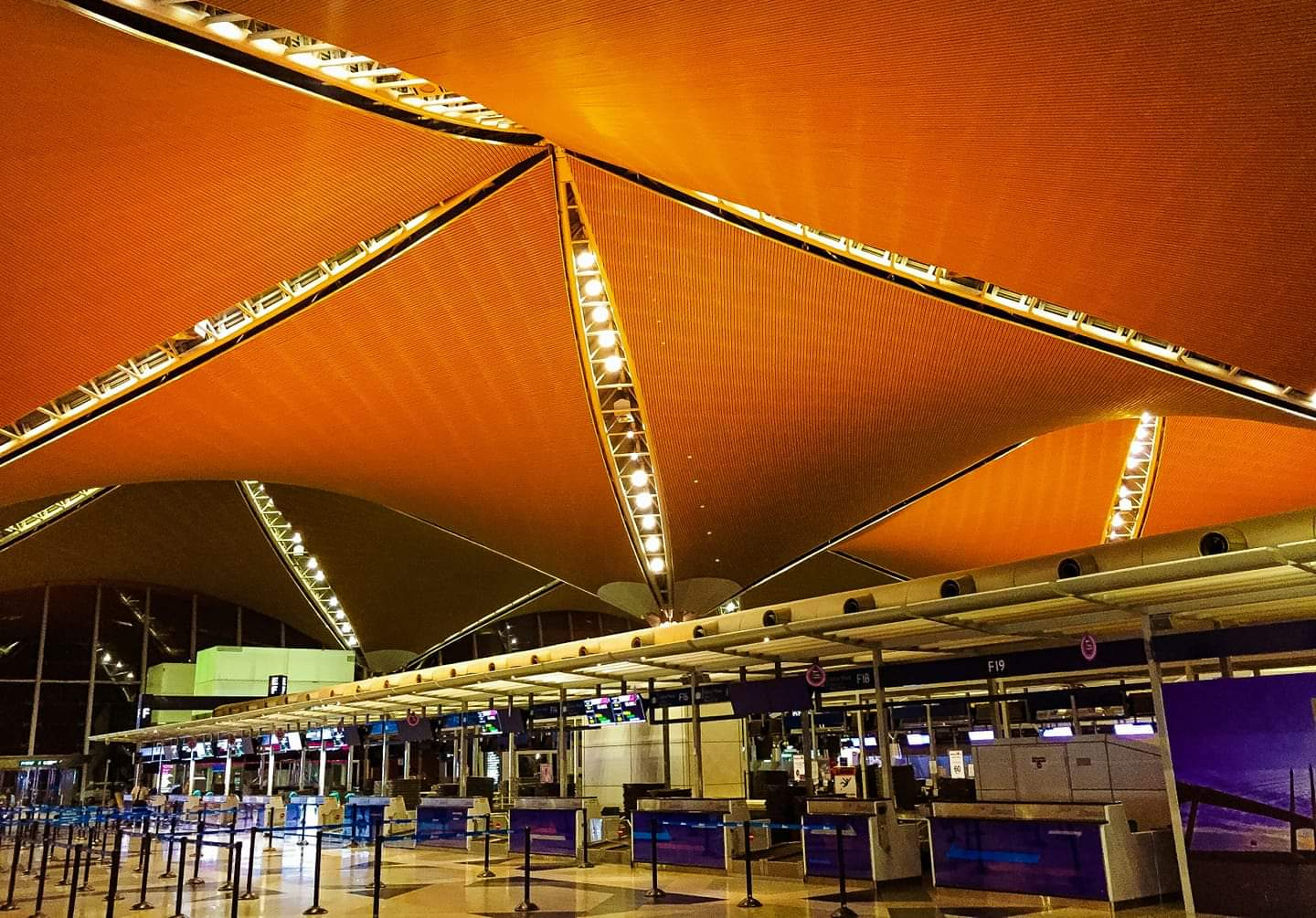
The modern architecture of KLIA was inspired by the traditional Malay architecture.

Several design elements of traditional Malaysian architecture are adapted to modern structures to reflect the Malaysian identity. Wood, an important element in traditional Malay buildings, is also reinterpreted and readapted in the modern landscape in the Kuala Lumpur International Airport and Putrajaya. Some of these buildings also incorporated Islamic geometric motifs and designs, such as square patterns or a dome. With the help of modern technology, Malaysian firms are developing skyscraper designs that are specifically for Malaysia's tropical climates.

The stilt elevated undulating roof structure of the KLIA is supposed to imitate the traditional Malay-styled raised village houses. In Putrajaya, the Prime Minister's office is lined with wood panels to achieve the design goal. The underside of the KLIA's domed roof structure is similarly "clad in narrow strips of wood" which the architect suggests, "alludes to vernacular Malaysian timber structures, reinterpreting traditional building methods and strengthening the sense of local identity".

In modern times, the government has promoted different projects, from the tallest twin buildings in the world, the Petronas Twin Towers, to a whole garden city, Putrajaya. Malaysian firms are developing skyscraper designs that are specifically for tropical climates.
