= Radin Mas, Singapore =

Neighbourhood in Bukit Merah, Singapore

Radin Mas

Other transcription(s)
  - Chinese: 拉丁马士
  - Pinyin: Lādīngmǎshì
  - Malay: Radin Mas
  - Jawi: رادين مس
  - Javanese: ꦫꦢꦶꦤ꧀ꦩꦱ꧀
  - Tamil: ரடின் மாஸ்
- Radin Mas, as seen from the peak of Mount Faber in 2026.
- Interactive map of Radin Mas

Radin Mas is a neighbourhood located in the Telok Blangah subzone of Bukit Merah within the Central Region, Singapore. Originating in the 19th century as a village named Kampung Radin Mas, it is situated in the direct vicinity of Mount Faber.

== Etymology ==
The neighborhood is named after Radin Mas Ayu, a semi-legendary Javanese princess and a royal consort who is buried on a hill atop Mount Faber. The name of Radin Mas means "princess of gold" and her story is well-known amongst most Singaporeans.

== History ==
The present-day Radin Mas neighborhood was originally a village named Kampung Radin Mas, which was established in the 19th century in the outskirts of Mount Faber and bordered the wider Kampung Bahru village, including Bukit Purmei. The exact year when the village was established is unknown, but locals agree that it was not too long after the arrival of Sir Stamford Raffles to Temasek. Being a multiracial settlement with a prominent Malay Muslim population, the village was served by a single mosque that was built in the 1920s by Abdul Halim bin Karto, with a madrasa system later added to the mosque in 1953. Around the same time the mosque was built, an istana was erected by relatives of the Sultan of Johor, although the istana was later abandoned during the Second World War and afterwards converted into a primary school in the 1950s. Then in the late 1960s, modern apartment buildings were built around Mount Faber by the Housing and Development Board (HDB) to replace the village, which resulted in Kampung Radin Mas being completely demolished by mid 1973. The HDB also ensured that all of the former residents were relocated to the housing blocks that made up the new Radin Mas neighborhood.

As of 2015, the boundaries of the current Radin Mas neighbourhood consist of the entire Bukit Purmei area, as well as the two housing estates of Telok Blangah Rise and Telok Blangah Way, all of which are in the vicinity of Mount Faber and are ruled by a single-member constituency.

== Amenities ==
=== Community ===
Radin Mas has a dedicated community club for its residents, which is adjacent to the Al-Amin Mosque along Telok Blangah Way.

=== Education ===
There is one primary school in the area, the Radin Mas Primary School which was established at its present location along Bukit Purmei Avenue in 1984.

=== Religious sites ===
The only mosque in Radin Mas is the Al-Amin Mosque, built in 1991 and situated along Telok Blangah Way. Within the Bukit Purmei part of Radin Mas, there is a historic royal cemetery and shrine known as the Keramat Bukit Kasita which contains the graves of Malay nobility as well as the relatives of the Sultan of Johor.

== Transportation ==
Radin Mas is served by the HarbourFront MRT station and its attached bus interchange. There is also the Bukit Merah Bus Interchange which generally serves areas around Radin Mas and Telok Blangah.

== See also ==
- Telok Blangah
