= Marang Cemetery =

Historic cemetery in Telok Blangah, Singapore

Marang Cemetery Tanah Perkuburan Marang (تانه فركوبورن مارغ) Mǎráng Fénchǎng (馬朗墳場)

- Location in Singapore

Religion
- Affiliation: Sunni Islam

Location
- Location: 45 Marang Road, Singapore 099280
- Country: Singapore
- Coordinates: 1.2667420°N 103.8213409°E

Architecture
- Type: Cemetery
- Founder: Ahmad Marang Omar
- Established: 1866

The Marang Cemetery (Malay: Tanah Perkuburan Marang, Jawi: تانه ڤركوبورن مارڠ) is an abandoned burial ground located off Marang Road at the foothills of Mount Faber in Bukit Merah, Singapore. Once thought to be a royal cemetery, it was formerly part of a larger village and is one of three Islamic cemeteries in Bukit Merah, the other two being Keramat Bukit Kasita and Makam Diraja Johor Telok Blangah.

== History ==
The cemetery was originally part of a Malay settlement known as Kampung Marang, which stood at the foothills of Mount Faber in the Telok Blangah locality within Bukit Merah. The founder of the village, Ahmad Marang Omar, was an immigrant from the town of Marang in Terengganu, hence the name of the village. The earliest interment at the cemetery dates back to 1866 and belongs to a member of the Marang family. The place was formerly widely known to locals outside Kampung Marang as a royal burial ground due to its close proximity to the residence of the Temenggong of Johor, but this claim was disapproved with an investigation conducted in 1928 by a colonial surveyor, which concluded that the area was a commoner's cemetery. Burials ceased in 1973 after the National Environment Agency had given the order for burials of all religions to be conducted exclusively within the Choa Chu Kang Cemetery. Kampung Marang was eventually abandoned in the 20th century after a large fire destroyed most of the settlement in 1983. The graveyard was left intact and the entombed had their names recorded on microfilm for archival purposes in 1997, a process which was carried out to a fellow abandoned cemetery, Kubur Kassim.

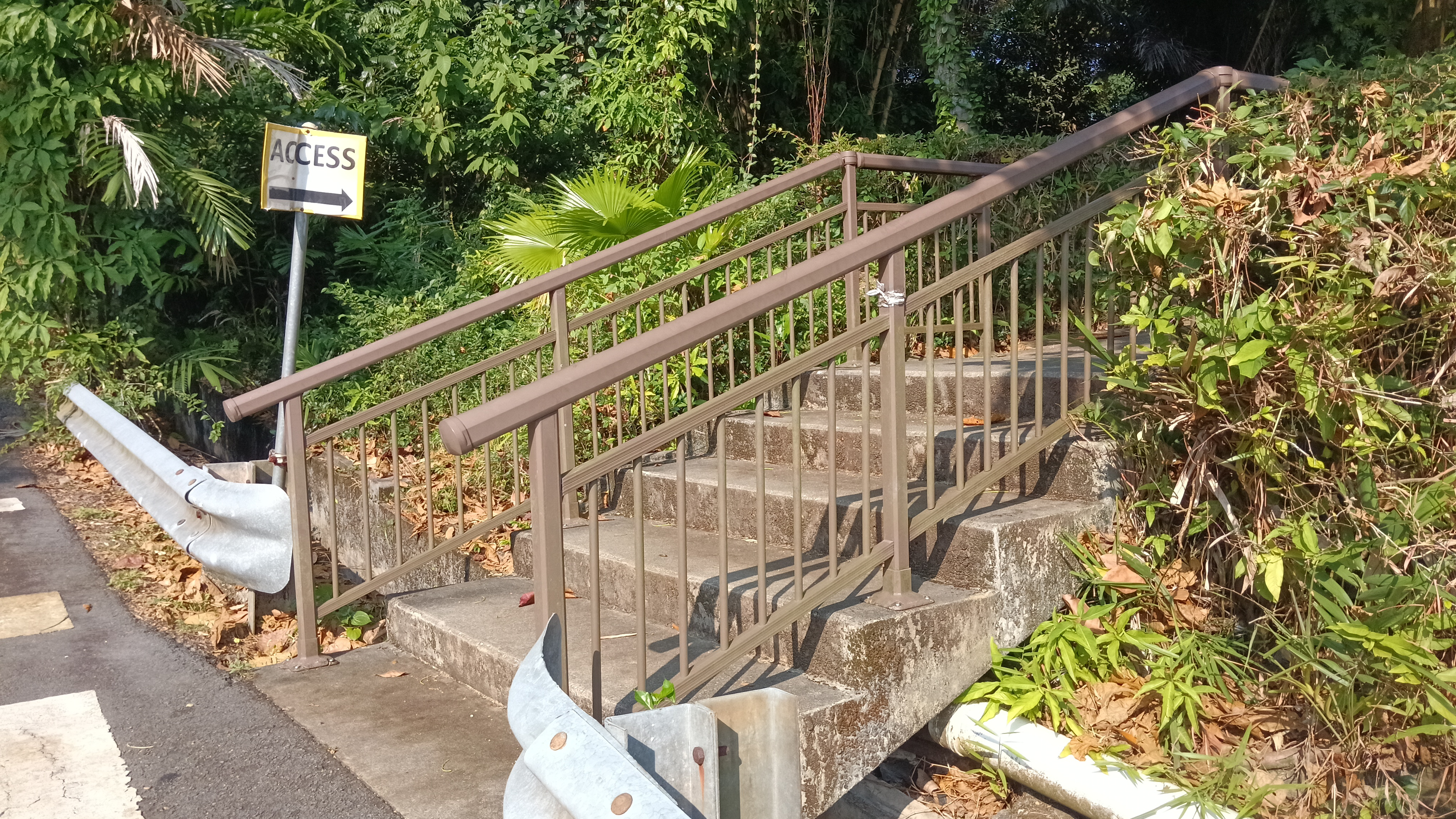
The entrance to the burial ground from Marang Road.

There are at least two hundred graves at the site, most of which have been overgrown due to abandonment, especially those of once-celebrated merchants, chieftains and politicians. Unlike the other Islamic burial grounds that have existed in Telok Blangah, the Marang Cemetery does not have any royal affiliations, nor are the graves in the area venerated as keramats by locals. After the cemetery was rediscovered in 2019, more public attention was brought to the cemetery by local heritage researcher Sarafian Salleh, who was accompanied by former villager Rafeah Mohammed Tahir in documenting the history of the site as well as cleaning it. As of 2026, the land the cemetery stands on is under the management of the Urban Redevelopment Authority, which has also marked the place as being part of a recreational park area.

== Prominent burials ==
The tomb of Abdul Halim bin Karto in the Marang Cemetery.

- Ahmad Omar Marang, an immigrant from Terengganu who founded the Malay settlement of Kampung Marang.
- Abdul Hamid Marang (d. 1955), a merchant from Terengganu and the co-founder of a mosque at Novena, which was later known as Masjid Abdul Hamid.
- Abdul Halim bin Karto (d. 1943), a former qāḍī and a Justice of Peace in the colonial courts regarding Malay affairs, as well as an ancestor of local politician Wan Hussin Zoohri. Abdul Halim was the founder of two mosques, Masjid Al-Huda at Bukit Timah as well as a mosque at the Keramat Bukit Kasita complex in Bukit Purmei.

== Transportation ==
The cemetery is situated on the right of Marang Road facing Mount Faber and can be accessed from Exit A of the HarbourFront MRT station.

== See also ==
- Muslim cemeteries in Singapore
