= Abdul Halim bin Karto =

Muslim judge and community leader of colonial Singapore

- Kyai
- Grave of Abdul Halim bin Karto in the Marang Cemetery at Telok Blangah.

Justice of the peace under the Mohammedan Advisory Board
- Reign: 1929–1934
- Born: 1860; Pekalongan, Dutch East Indies
- Died: 1943 (aged 82–83); Colonial Singapore
- Burial: Marang Cemetery
- Children: Haji Abu Bakar; Haji Ahmad
- Religion: Sunni Islam

Kyai Abdul Halim bin Karto (1860–1943) was a Justice of the peace, qāḍī and Islamic missionary of the Mohammedan Advisory Board who lived in colonial Singapore. Abdul Halim was also the founder of Masjid Al-Huda, a congregational mosque at Sixth Avenue, Singapore.

== Early life ==
Abdul Halim bin Karto was born in the town of Pekalongan in the Dutch East Indies in 1860. He emigrated to Singapore from Java in the late 19th century between 1885 and 1890, settling in Kampong Java and later in Bukit Timah, but ultimately settling in Bukit Merah.

== Religious career ==
Abdul Halim carried out missionary work in Singapore to propagate Sunni Islam and was hence known with the title Kyai, which was used to denote respected religious teachers in Javanese culture. Not long after his arrival in Singapore, he became a community leader for Malay Muslims in Bukit Timah and was one of the earliest to settle in Kampong Tempe, a Malay village along Sixth Avenue Road.

In 1911, Abdul Halim founded a surau for Kampung Radin Mas, a village at the outskirts of Telok Blangah, with permission from a family member of the Sultan of Johor. Later in 1925, he founded a surau at Coronation Road in Bukit Timah, which was completed in 1936 and later rebuilt into a mosque that was renamed as Masjid Al-Huda. Abdul Halim also founded a mosque, Masjid Kampong Bahru, at the front of an Islamic cemetery in Bukit Purmei, which was later incorporated into a religious complex known as Keramat Bukit Kasita. At an unspecified point of time, he built a mosque that was known as Masjid Telok Blangah.

Abdul Halim's services as qāḍī and a Justice of the peace under the Mohammedan Advisory Board between 1929 to 1934 were centred in Telok Blangah but also extended to the southern parts of Singapore including Pasir Panjang and Kampong Bahru.

== Personal life ==
One of his sons, Haji Abu Bakar bin Abdul Halim, served as the chairman of the Radin Mas Mosque located on Mount Faber. Another descendant of Abdul Halim bin Karto is Zahid Mohamed Zain, a local religious teacher and the CEO of the Muslim Youth Forum organization.

Abdul Halim's daughter, Safiah, married a Muslim scholar named Haji Zoohri, and from this marriage his grandson Wan Hussin Zoohri, who was born in 1937, who would become a politician and community leader.

== Death ==
Abdul Halim died in 1943 during the Second World War and was buried in the Marang Cemetery at the southern foothill of Mount Faber. His grave was situated behind the house of one of his companions, Abdul Hamid bin Marang.

== See also ==
- Tok Lassam
- Radin Mas Ayu
