= Masjid Al-Amin =

Mosque located in Telok Blangah, Singapore

Masjid Al-Amin مسجد الأمين
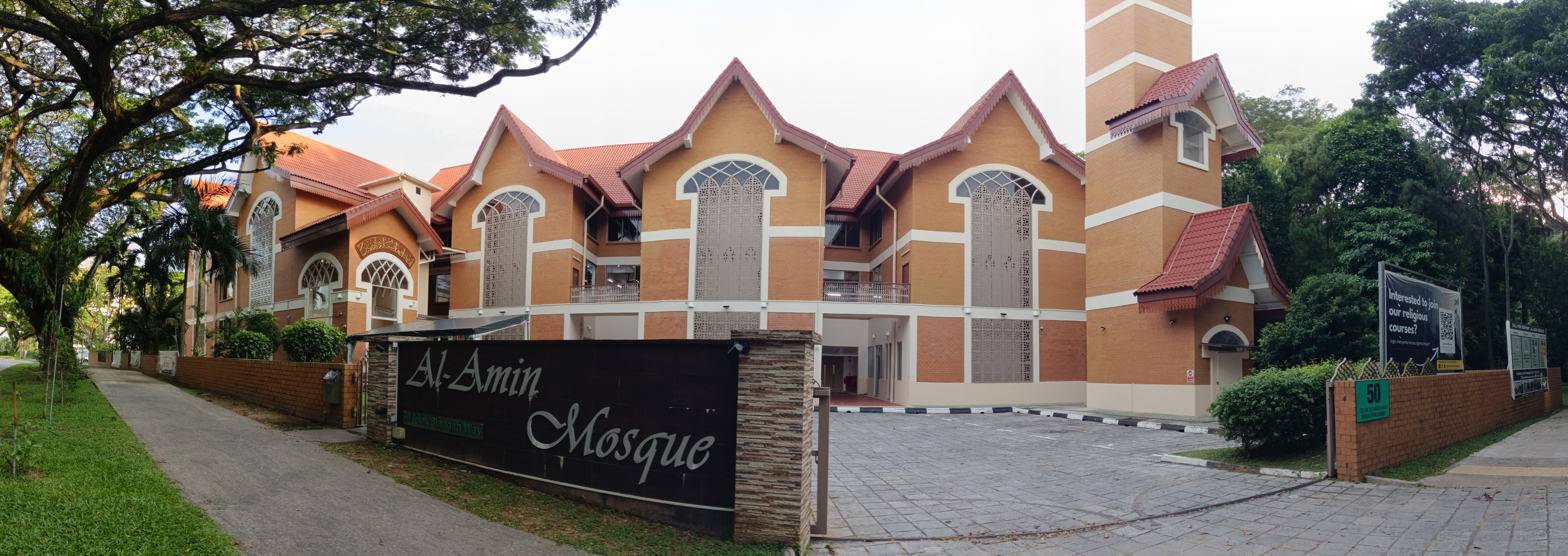
- A panoramic view of Masjid Al-Amin at Telok Blangah.

- Location in Singapore

Religion
- Affiliation: Sunni Islam

Location
- Location: 50 Telok Blangah Way, Singapore 098801
- Country: Singapore
- Coordinates: 1.2752080°N 103.8193973°E

Architecture
- Type: Congregational mosque
- Style: Minang architecture
- Established: 1981
- Completed: 31 April 1991
- Minaret: 1

Masjid Al-Amin (Jawi: مسجد الأمين) is a congregational mosque located at the foot of Mount Faber in the Telok Blangah subzone of Bukit Merah, Singapore. It is one of two mosques serving the area, the other being Masjid Temenggong Daeng Ibrahim. Built in 1991, the mosque features modern architecture inspired by the Rumah Gadang style. It is accessible from the HarbourFront MRT station.

== Etymology ==
The name of the mosque, Al-Amin, is inspired by the Arabic word ʾĀmīn which is recited after a prayer or supplication in Islamic tradition.

== History ==
In 1981, the Majlis Ugama Islam Singapura (MUIS) announced plans for the construction of a mosque named "Masjid Al-Amin" at a spot behind Mount Faber in Telok Blangah. Then in 1982, the contemporary Minister for Community Affairs, Ahmad Mattar, confirmed the location of Masjid Al-Amin to be located at the junction of Telok Blangah Way and Telok Blangah Rise, at the foot of Mount Faber that was surrounded by heavily populated residential estates. The construction project for Masjid Al-Amin was also placed under the Mosque Building Fund, an initiative by the MUIS for the establishment of mosques in the country. This mosque was intended to replace Masjid Radin Mas, a smaller mosque that stood in the area and was notably named after semi-legendary Javanese princess Radin Mas Ayu.

Masjid Al-Amin was ultimately completed on 31 April 1991, officially being opened to the public a day later. It served as the sole congregational mosque of central Telok Blangah, with Masjid Temenggong Daeng Ibrahim at the southern end of Telok Blangah. On 13 March 2020, Masjid Al-Amin and all seventy-one mosques in the country were closed down due to the COVID-19 pandemic, but all were later reopened to the public by 2022 after the end of the circuit breaker period.

== Architecture ==
Masjid Al-Amin is built in a modern architectural style that is influenced by Minangkabau architecture, such as Rumah Gadang, with tiered, curved roofs that have broad overhangs. The five roofs atop the main mosque building symbolize the five pillars of Islam. Timber panels also cover the metal infrastructure of the five roofs. The main ancillary building is divided into three levels, with the main prayer hall on the second level, female prayer hall on the third, while a madrasa annex and wide balcony is situated behind both prayer halls. There is also a single minaret that overlooks the mosque.

Malay architectural elements are also present in the mosque. The wooden mihrab, minbar and furnishings in the main prayer hall are all designed with traditional Malay and Islamic styles, while seventeen lamps in the mosque are also intended to symbolize the total number of raka'ats of the five daily prayers in the Islamic religion. The exterior of the mosque is primarily a light brown in colour with white highlights, while the roofs are a darker shade of brown.

== Transportation ==
Masjid Al-Amin is accessible via bus service 131 from the bus stop at Exit A of the HarbourFront MRT station.

== See also ==
- Islam in Singapore
- List of mosques in Singapore
