= Masjid Abdul Hamid =

Mosque in Novena, Singapore

Masjid Abdul Hamid Kampung Pasiran
- Jawi: مسجد عبد الحميد
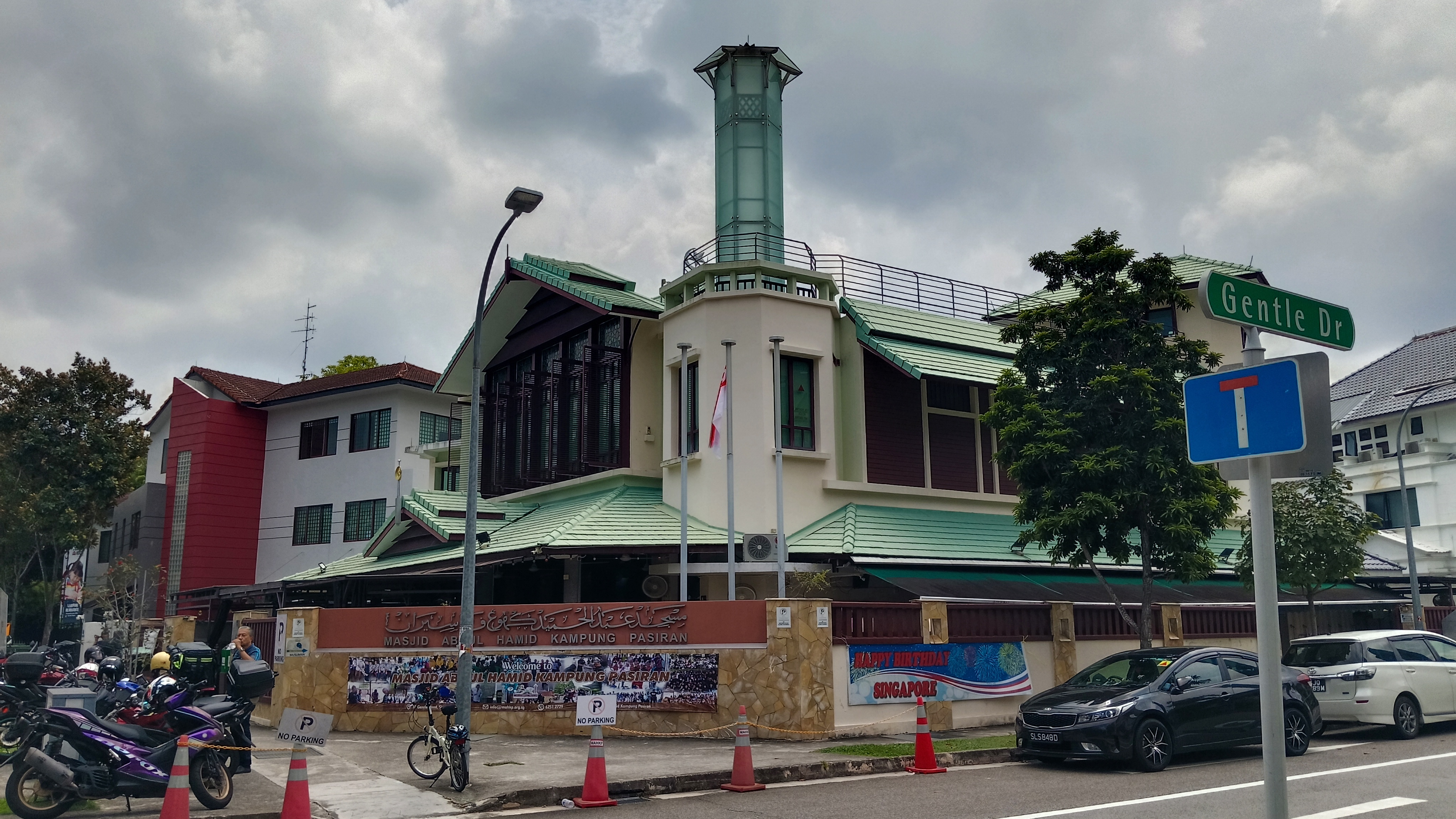

- Location in Singapore

Religion
- Affiliation: Sunni Islam

Location
- Location: 10 Gentle Road, Singapore 309194
- Country: Singapore
- Coordinates: 1.3200460°N 103.8410468°E

Architecture
- Type: Mosque
- Style: Modernist architecture
- Founder: Abdul Hamid Marang; Abdul Latiff Samidin
- Completed: 1932 (Original structure); 2003 (Reconstruction)

Masjid Abdul Hamid Kampung Pasiran, or simply Masjid Abdul Hamid is a mosque located in Novena, Singapore. Originally built in 1932 on the site of a former cattle pen, it is named after Abdul Hamid Marang, one of two founders of the mosque. The mosque was later rebuilt in 2003 and reinaugurated in the same year.

== History ==
The original structure at the site was a derelict cattle pen situated in Kampong Pasiran, a Malay village and settlement in what is now the present-day Novena planning area. Two businessmen from Terengganu, Abdul Hamid Marang and Abdul Latiff Samidin, purchased the cattle pen and demolished it, releasing the land as an endowment for the construction of a mosque. Completed in 1932, the mosque was named after Abdul Hamid Marang and took the form of a small wooden structure akin to a surau. After the construction of the mosque, Marang moved to Telok Blangah to establish Kampong Marang, a Malay settlement at the foot of Mount Faber, where he lived the rest of his life until the Second World War. After 1968, the mosque fell under the purview of the Majlis Ugama Islam Singapura (MUIS) and was approved as a centre for the collection of zakat. By 1980, Kampong Pasiran had been cleared for the establishment of bungalows and terrace houses as part of the Gentle Drive elite housing estate, leaving only the mosque as the last remnant of the former settlement.

The wooden mosque was later deemed to have insufficient space for additional congregants during the Friday prayers, hence in 1986 a reconstruction for the mosque was proposed by the MUIS as part of a wider project to modernize two mosques, namely Masjid Abdul Hamid and Masjid Kassim. The reconstruction project for the former was officially started in 2000 after sufficient funds had been collected for the early stages of demolishing and rebuilding the mosque from the ground up. By early January 2003, the new mosque had been halfway completed, with a large sum of donations received from the Singapore Minang Association to complete the construction funds. The mosque was completed by mid 2003 and reopened on 24 October 2003, with Syed Isa Semait present at the reinauguration ceremony.

== Architecture ==
Masjid Abdul Hamid is built in a modernized style that incorporates classical Malay village house elements such as a zinc roof, wooden tiles and windows with wood panels. The main prayer hall and male ablution areas are situated on the ground level, while a staircase leads to the female prayer hall and extra ablution areas on the second level. In the southwestern corner of the building is a glass tower intended to evoke a minaret, held together with metal rebars and fences. The interior of the mosque also features air conditioning.

== Transportation ==
Masjid Abdul Hamid is situated at least 450 metres from the Novena MRT station on the North–South MRT line and is directly accessible from there without the need for pedestrian crossings.

== See also ==
- Islam in Singapore
- List of mosques in Singapore
