= Keramat Bukit Kasita =

Historic cemetery in Bukit Merah, Singapore

Keramat Bukit Kasita Tanah Kubor Raja (مقبرة الملك) Wǔ Jí Kǎ Xī Tǎ Shèng Líng (武吉卡西塔圣陵)
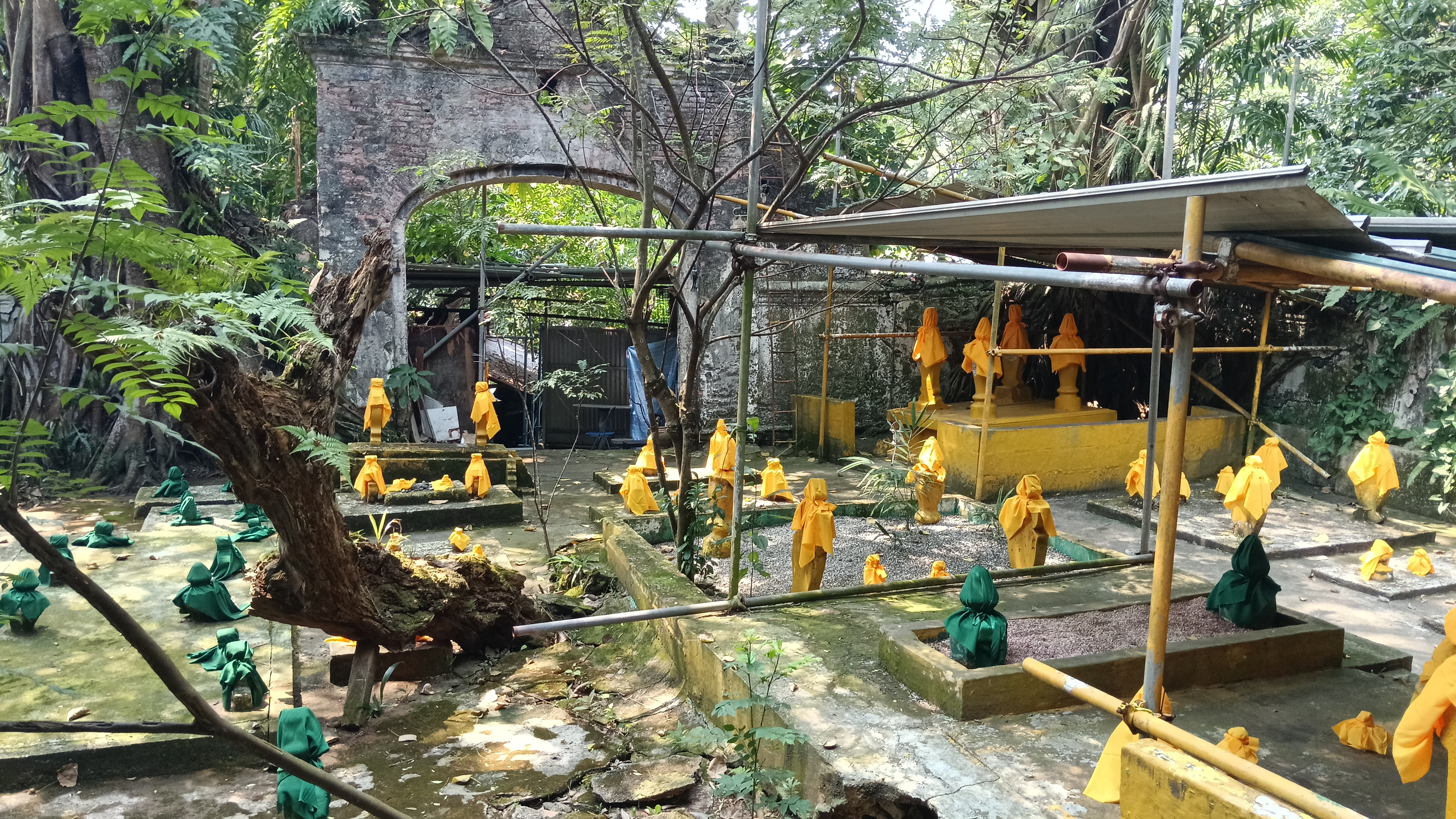

- Location in Singapore

Religion
- Affiliation: Sunni Islam

Location
- Location: 102 Bukit Purmei Rd, Block 102, Singapore 090102
- Country: Singapore
- Coordinates: 1.2726672°N 103.8265296°E

Architecture
- Type: Cemetery
- Style: Neoclassical architecture
- Founder: Abdul Halim bin Karto (Mosque only)
- Completed: 19th century

Keramat Bukit Kasita also known as the Tanah Kubur Raja (Jawi: مقبرة الملك; lit. "Royal Burial Ground") is a historic cemetery located within the Bukit Purmei housing estate in Bukit Merah, Singapore. In existence since the 17th century, the cemetery contains over two hundred graves, with the main segment of the burial ground comprising a 19th-century walled compound built in the style of Neoclassical architecture. The site is adjacent to the Telok Blangah neighborhood as well as the Keppel MRT station.

== History ==
The earliest burials at the site of Keramat Bukit Kasita date back to the 1610s and belong to Javanese nobility, some of which claimed descent from Sang Nila Utama, the legendary founder of Singapore. The oldest surviving grave, however, dates back to 1721. The cemetery served the former settlement of Bukit Maula, which was later known as Radin Mas, named after the semi-legendary princess Radin Mas Ayu. Local tradition states that the burial ground was originally founded in the 1530s by Alauddin Riayat Shah II, founder of the Sultanate of Johor, although there is no evidence for this claim. The cemetery saw widespread usage during the 19th century, with several graves dating to the reign of Sultan Hussein Shah. The walls surrounding the cemetery were also built around the same time. In the 1930s, Haji Abdul Halim bin Karto, founder of Masjid Al-Huda, built a mosque at the entrance of Keramat Bukit Kasita, which was later named Masjid Kampong Bahru in reference to the nearby road. Later in 1954, the site was registered under the name "Tanah Kubor Raja" in the colonial street directory and described as being the burial place of a group of Bugis immigrants who had accompanied the Temenggongs of Johor.

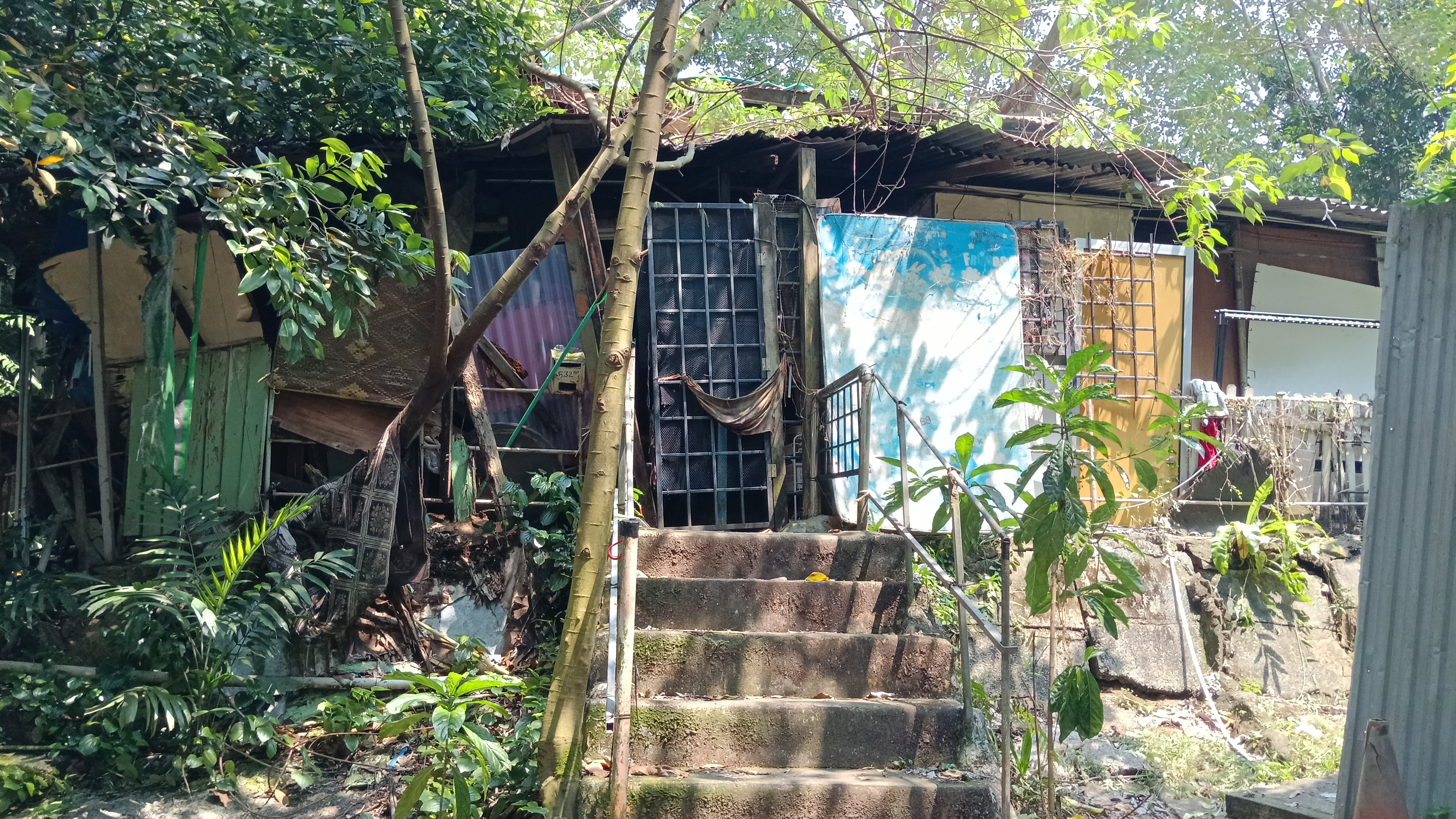
The ruined mosque at the entrance to the site, which is now an on-site residence for the caretaker.

By the late 1970s, Keramat Bukit Kasita had become situated in the midst of the high-rise housing in the newly-built Bukit Purmei residential estate. Burials in the cemetery had officially ceased by 1973, along with other Islamic cemeteries outside of Choa Chu Kang such as the Kubur Kassim cemetery and the burial ground of Fatimah binte Sulaiman at Beach Road. The mosque at the cemetery was also decommissioned and hence did not appear on the official registry of the local Islamic council, the Majlis Ugama Islam Singapura. Despite the fact that the cemetery was no longer active, the enshrined grave of Raja Iskandar, a relative of Sultan Hussein Shah, was still visited by locals in the area by the 1990s.

Keramat Bukit Kasita is generally not open to the public. However, devotees and visitors are allowed to access the archway and patio of the cemetery. Visitors are also required to wear clothing that covers their knees to enter the premises, while flash photography is not permitted in the cemetery.

== Architecture ==
The core of Keramat Bukit Kasita is a walled enclosure, with the entrance and carved stone walls exhibiting Neoclassical architecture, a style common for the 19th century in Singapore. The enclosure has fifty-six graves belonging to members of royal lineage as well as followers of Sufi orders, with yellow shrouds over the tombstones indicating the burial of an entombed royalty, while a green shroud indicates the grave of a Sufi. There are two main keramats in the compound, which belong to relatives of Sultan Hussein Shah named Iskandar and Mohamed, the former being described as being an Islamic sage. Additionally, there are unmarked graves belonging to followers of the Wahhabi sect. Towards the northeastern end of the compound are tombs belonging to Raja Ahmad and Ungku Fatimah, two descendants of the Temenggong of Johor. At least two hundred tombs are present in the complex.

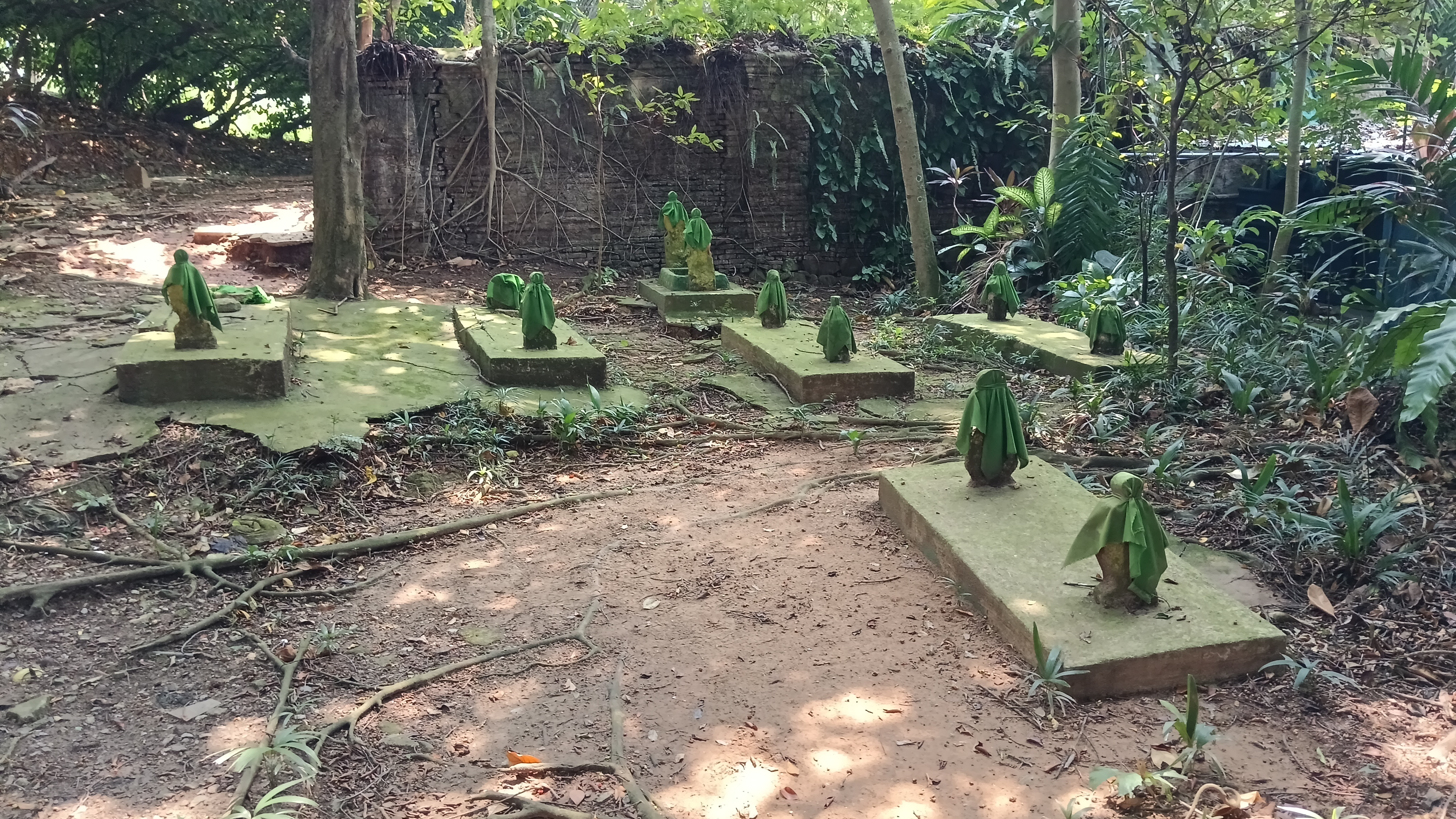
Tombs behind the village house at the entrance of the cemetery.

At the entrance of Keramat Bukit Kasita is a ruined mosque and former surau which now serves as an on-site residence for the caretaker. A small group of tombs shrouded in green can be found behind a disused village house at the entrance as well. Metal bars and railings were also installed at the cemetery in 2017 for easier accessibility as well as increased security.

== Transportation ==
Keramat Bukit Kasita is situated next to Block 102 of the Bukit Purmei residential estate, which is adjacent to Telok Blangah and is also within walking distance from the Keppel MRT station.

== See also ==
- Keramat (shrine)
- Muslim cemeteries in Singapore
