= Tan Kah Kee MRT station =

Mass Rapid Transit station in Singapore

Tan Kah Kee DT8 陈嘉庚 டான் கா கீ
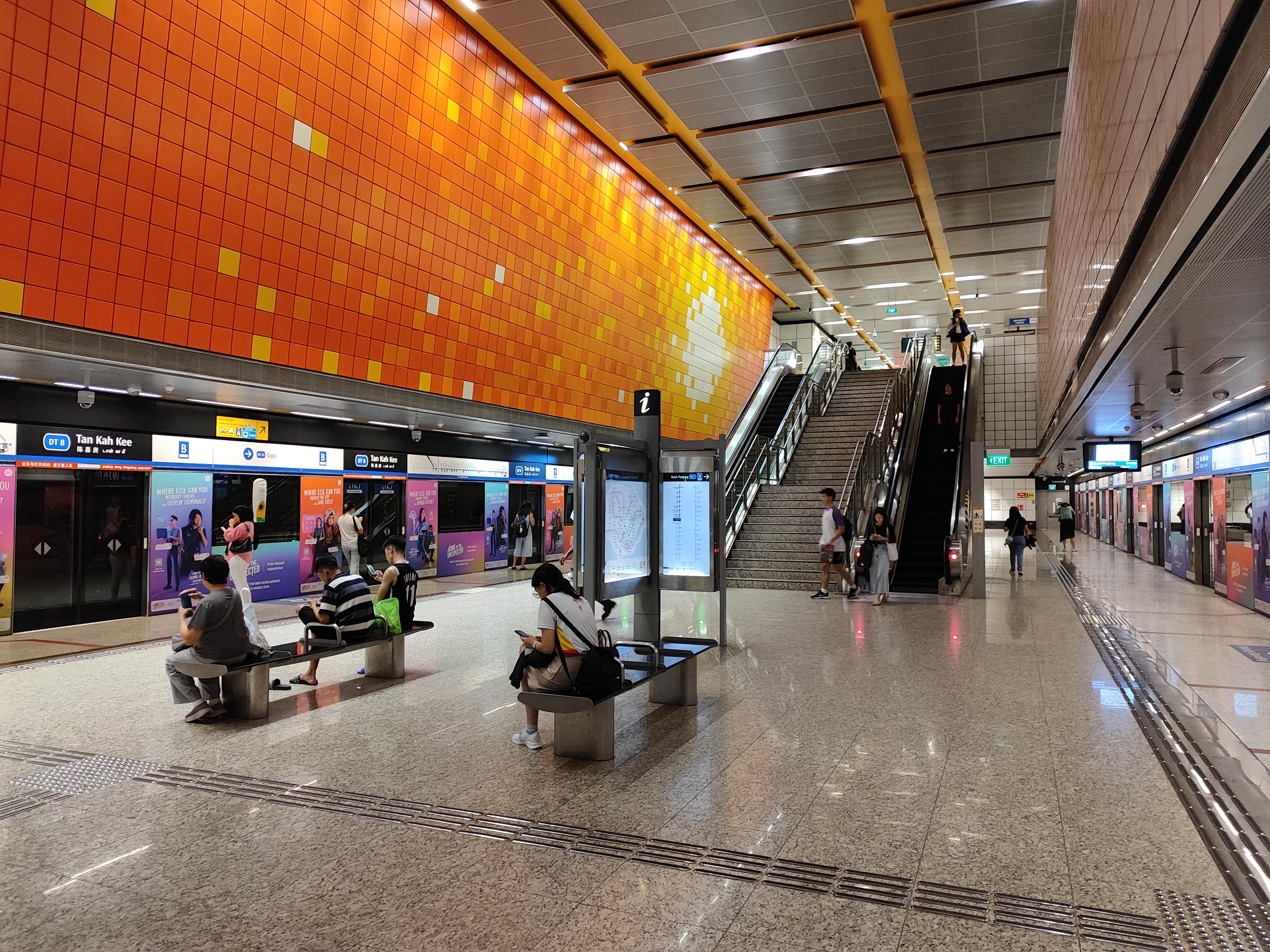
- Platform level of the station

General information
- Location: 651 Bukit Timah Road, Singapore 266268
- Coordinates: 01°19′34″N 103°48′26″E
- System: Mass Rapid Transit (MRT) station
- Owner: Land Transport Authority
- Operator: SBS Transit
- Line: Downtown Line
- Platforms: 2 (1 island platform)
- Tracks: 2
- Connections: Bus, Taxi

Construction
- Structure type: Underground
- Platform levels: 1
- Accessible: Yes

Other information
- Station code: TKK

History
- Opened: 27 December 2015; 10 years ago
- Former names: Duchess, Hwa Chong, Kah Kee, Watten

Passengers
- June 2024: 3,405 per day

Services
Preceding station	Mass Rapid Transit	Following station
Sixth Avenue towards Bukit Panjang	Downtown Line	Botanic Gardens towards Expo
Track layout
Location
- Location within Singapore Rail

Tan Kah Kee MRT station is an underground Mass Rapid Transit (MRT) station on the Downtown Line (DTL) in Bukit Timah, Singapore. Located directly underneath the campus of Hwa Chong Institution (HCI), this station was named after the founder of the institution Tan Kah Kee. In addition to HCI, other educational institutions within the vicinity of this station include Nanyang Girls' High School, Raffles Girls' Primary School and National Junior College.

First announced as Duchess MRT station, it was renamed to Tan Kah Kee through a public poll in 2009. The name has attracted some criticism as the name was viewed as "misleading" and does not properly reflect the locality. In June 2013, Tan Kah Kee station was one of three stations affected by the sudden dissolution of Alpine Bau – the contractor for the construction of these stations. Initially forecast to open in mid-2016, the station opened on 27 December 2015 along with the DTL Stage 2 stations. The station features two murals – Gratitude and Resilience – created by HCI students as part of the network's Art-in-Transit programme.

== History ==
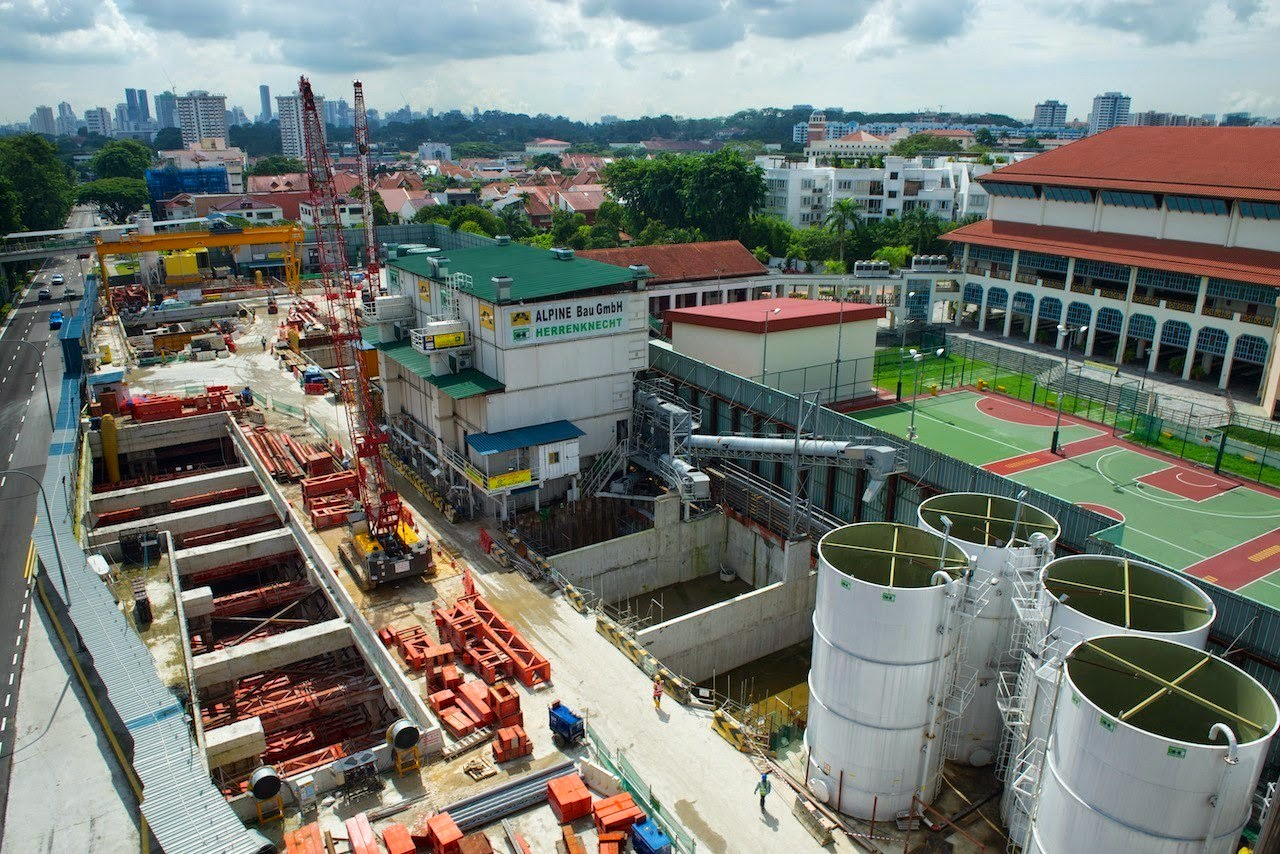
Excavation works in the fourth quarter of 2012

The station was first announced as "Duchess" station when the stations on Downtown Line Stage 2 (DTL2) were revealed in July 2008. The station name was finalised as "Tan Kah Kee" through a public poll in July 2009. Contract 918 for the design and construction of the station and the adjacent tunnels was awarded to Alpine Bau GmbH (Singapore Branch) at a value of S$350 million (US$240.7 million) in September 2009. (Note: The contractor was also awarded contract 917 for the construction of Sixth Avenue and King Albert Park stations and tunnels.) Construction was targeted to begin in early 2010.

During the construction, the 10 m (33 ft) tall granite gateways for the Hwa Chong Institution (HCI) had to be dismantled and relocated temporarily. Underpinning the gateways was initially considered, but it was figured that it will be unfeasible because of the extensive excavation for the station. The arch consists of emerald-green tiles, which were first removed and mounted on temporary pillars located 40 m (130 ft) away, while the metal gates were removed. The relocation was closely supervised by a safety and lifting team. The gateways were later reinstated when the station was completed.

The station has additionally affected about 15,000 m^{2} (18,000 sq yd) of the school campus. The sports complex was demolished while the Land Transport Authority (LTA) paid for the rent of the sports locations being used for the school's sports activities. A new indoor sports hall was rebuilt with a grant by the Ministry of Education and funds raised by the Singapore Chinese High School director board.

Between July and August 2012, concerns were raised on the structural integrity of terraced and semi-detached residences of Watten Estate surrounding the station, with complaints of "hairline cracks" appearing on walls inside and outside the affected properties. The LTA made an inspection and reported that the houses were found to be structurally safe. Additional steps were taken to repair damages to the properties and stabilise the ground in the area.

=== Contractor's insolvency ===
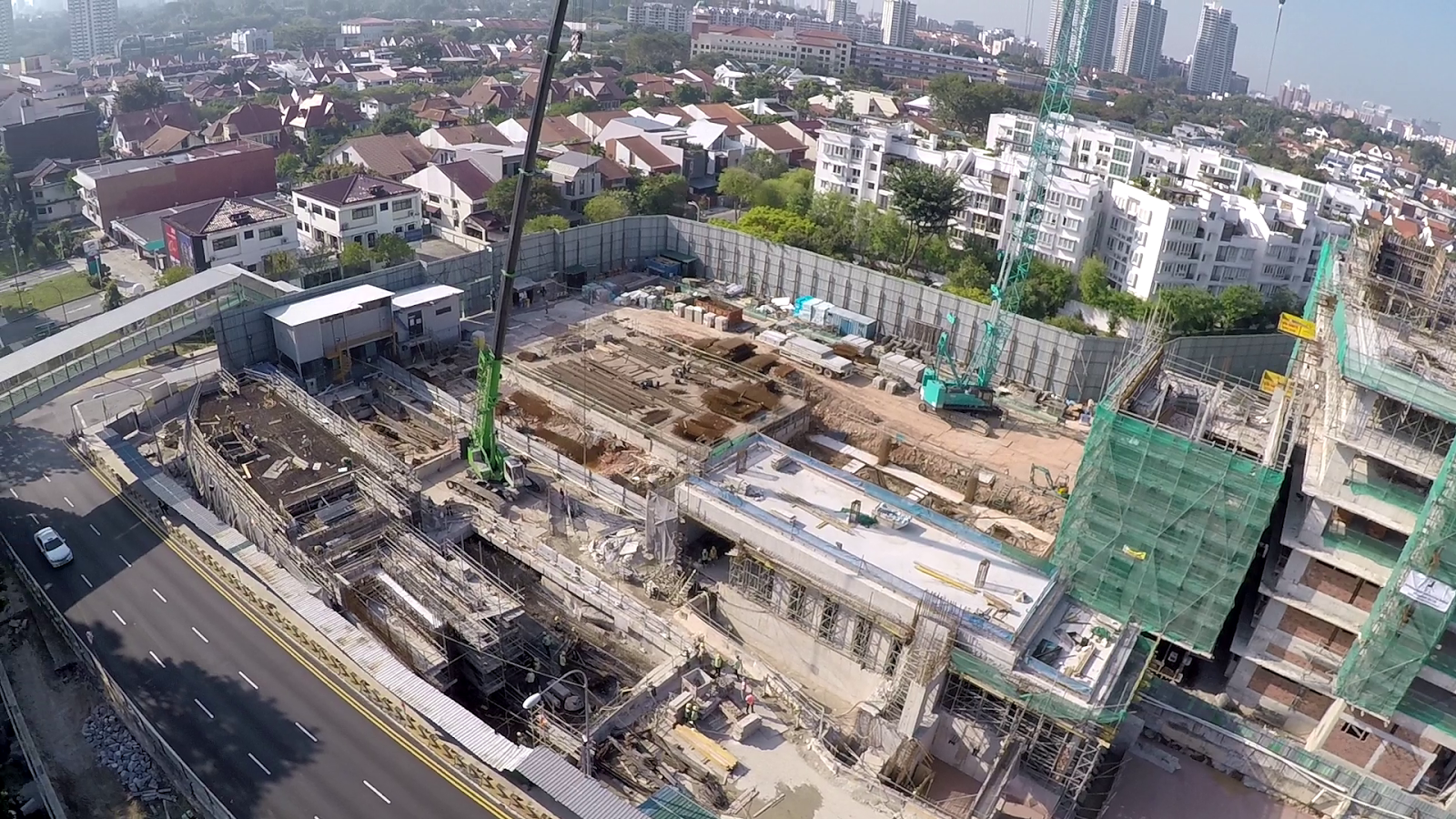
Construction site of the station as of March 2015

On 19 June 2013, the main contractor for the station Alpine Bau went bankrupt. The sudden insolvency caught the LTA by surprise, as the construction was going well by then. Described to be an "unprecedented situation", the LTA immediately took action to salvage the situation. A security firm was employed to protect the sites and the incomplete structures, while the LTA worked with experts to preserve the tunnel boring machines and recharge wells. As the LTA tried to seek a new contractor, the LTA temporarily appointed McConnell Dowell South East Asia, the contractor for Beauty World station, as the caretaker contractor to carry on tunnelling works. Through engagement with the Ministry of Manpower, the 400 workers who were affected were reassigned or sent home.

On 29 August 2013, the LTA announced the appointment of two new contractors for Tan Kah Kee and the two other stations. The contract for the completion of Tan Kah Kee station and associated tunnels was awarded to SK E&C (Singapore) at a contract sum of $222 million (US$177 million). The contractors were appointed just eight weeks after the insolvency, whereas usually, a tender needed at least six months for evaluation and processing. The quick appointment was to reduce the delay for the completion of DTL2.

To speed up the construction as much as possible, manpower for the construction of these stations increased by 25%, with workers taking up additional graveyard shifts so that works could keep going throughout the day and night. To reduce inconvenience to residents, rather than using conventional breakers, quieter wire saws were utilised to break up the concrete struts.

=== Opening ===
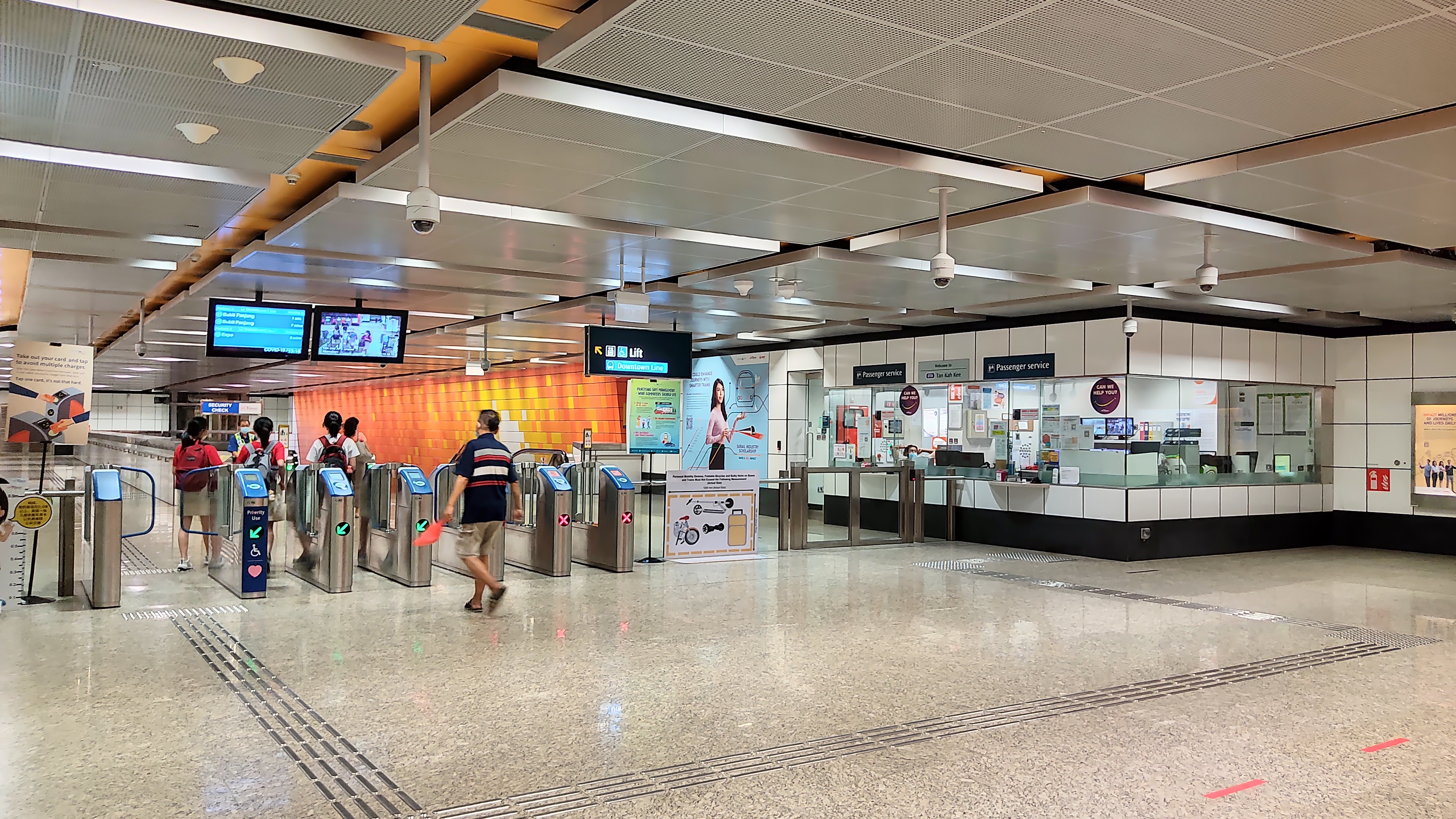
Concourse level of the station

On 28 June 2015, Transport Minister Lui Tuck Yew announced that the DTL2 would be opened earlier, with the works 95% complete. The LTA managed to bring forward the completion as the staff worked through many weekends and "sleepless nights". The engineers were reported to be "equally proud and relieved" of the achievement and they were credited for their cooperation and hard work. In August that year, Lui announced that the DTL2 segment would open on 27 December 2015.

At the DTL2 open house on 5 December 2015, the LTA was informed by netizens that the Tamil translation of the station was incorrect. The LTA apologised for the error and corrected the spelling. The station opened on 27 December along with the other DTL2 stations.

== Station details ==
=== Name ===
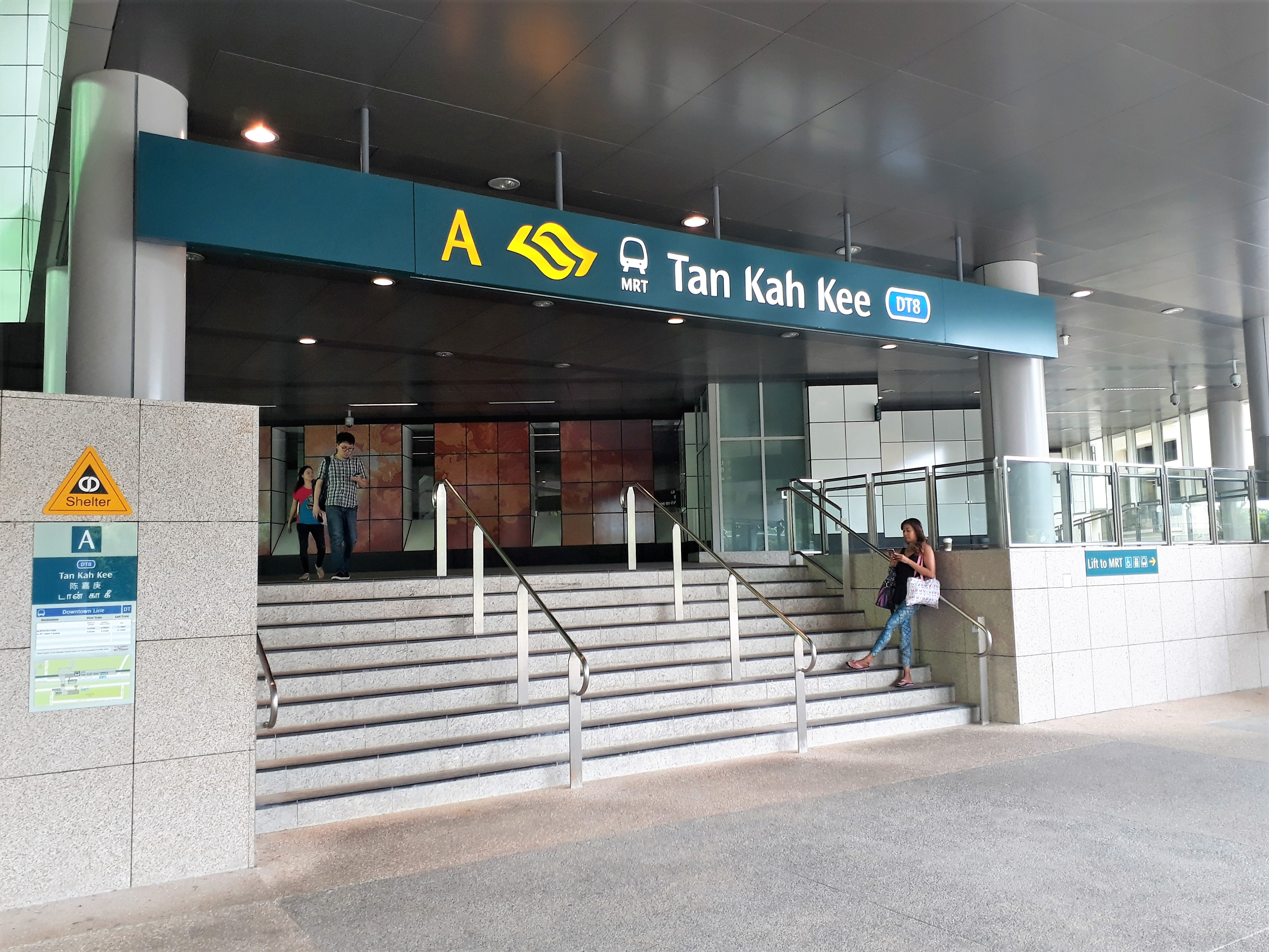
Exit A of Tan Kah Kee station, which is directly outside Hwa Chong Institution

The station was provisionally named Duchess, after a nearby road. In August 2008, when the LTA was seeking suggestions for the DTL2 station names, there surfaced a campaign online for the station to be named "Hwa Chong" after the school, although LTA stated that station names should not be named after public structures. While some HCI students and the surrounding residents criticized the campaign as being too "narcissistic" and "unfair", it was supported by other students of HCI and the other surrounding schools, who argued the school had been a part of Singapore's history for eighty years.

Following the consultation exercise, the LTA shortlisted two other names in addition to the holding name – "Watten" and "Kah Kee". "Kah Kee" was eventually chosen through the public poll, although it was subsequently changed to the then-current name "Tan Kah Kee", after the HCI's founder and philanthropist Tan Kah Kee. This came after the school board suggested adopting the full name, as they felt "Kah Kee" did not reflect the "historical significance" of the founder, as well as reflected a concern that it sounded too similar to kaki, a Malay word for leg. Then-principal of the school Ang Wee Hiong hailed the station name as a "tribute" to their founder and many HCI students were quoted as saying the station name was something to be "proud of". The name was also praised for recognising Tan's selfless contribution to the local education and the Chinese community as a businessman, community leader and philanthropist. A road within the school was also named after the founder.

The name, however, has attracted criticism. Ang Swee Hoon, an associate professor at the NUS Business School, said that the station might not be meaningful to those who did not graduate from Hwa Chong and was unlikely to foster any "appreciation" to the philanthropist's contributions. She added that an MRT station should be named after where it was located, similarly to in marketing, where she said a product's name should be reflective of its quality. Ang also indicated that the name might be even more perplexing should Hwa Chong move from its current location. A journalist from the Straits Times and a student from HCI, Jeremy Au Yong, has also criticised the station name and the new scheme of naming stations, saying that there was now no direct link to the station name and its location. Au Yong has also warned that the name could set the precedent for stations being named after "glamorous cities", "aspirational goals", "abstract ideology" and "corporate sponsors". The LTA defended the station naming by saying it had been one of the shortlisted names which was able to reflect the area's history and heritage while attaining the most votes through the public poll. However, it agreed that station names should be "commuter-friendly" and pledged to consider public feedback and seek more meaningful names in subsequent naming exercises.

=== Location ===
The station is located along Bukit Timah Road and is partly underneath the HCI campus. In addition to HCI, the station serves other schools such as Nanyang Primary School, St. Margaret's Secondary School, Nanyang Girls' High School, National Junior College and Raffles Girls' Primary School. It is also close to the two retail centres of Coronation Plaza and Crown Centre, and the two other landmarks of Poh Ming Tse Temple and Kuan Yin San Temple. It is also close by to condominiums along Duchess Road and Shelford Road such as the Watten House Condo.

=== Services ===
Tan Kah Kee station serves the Downtown Line (DTL) and is situated between the Sixth Avenue and Botanic Gardens stations. The station code is DT8 as reflected on official maps. The station operates between 5:44 am and 12:34 am daily, with headways of 2 to 5 minutes.

=== Station design ===
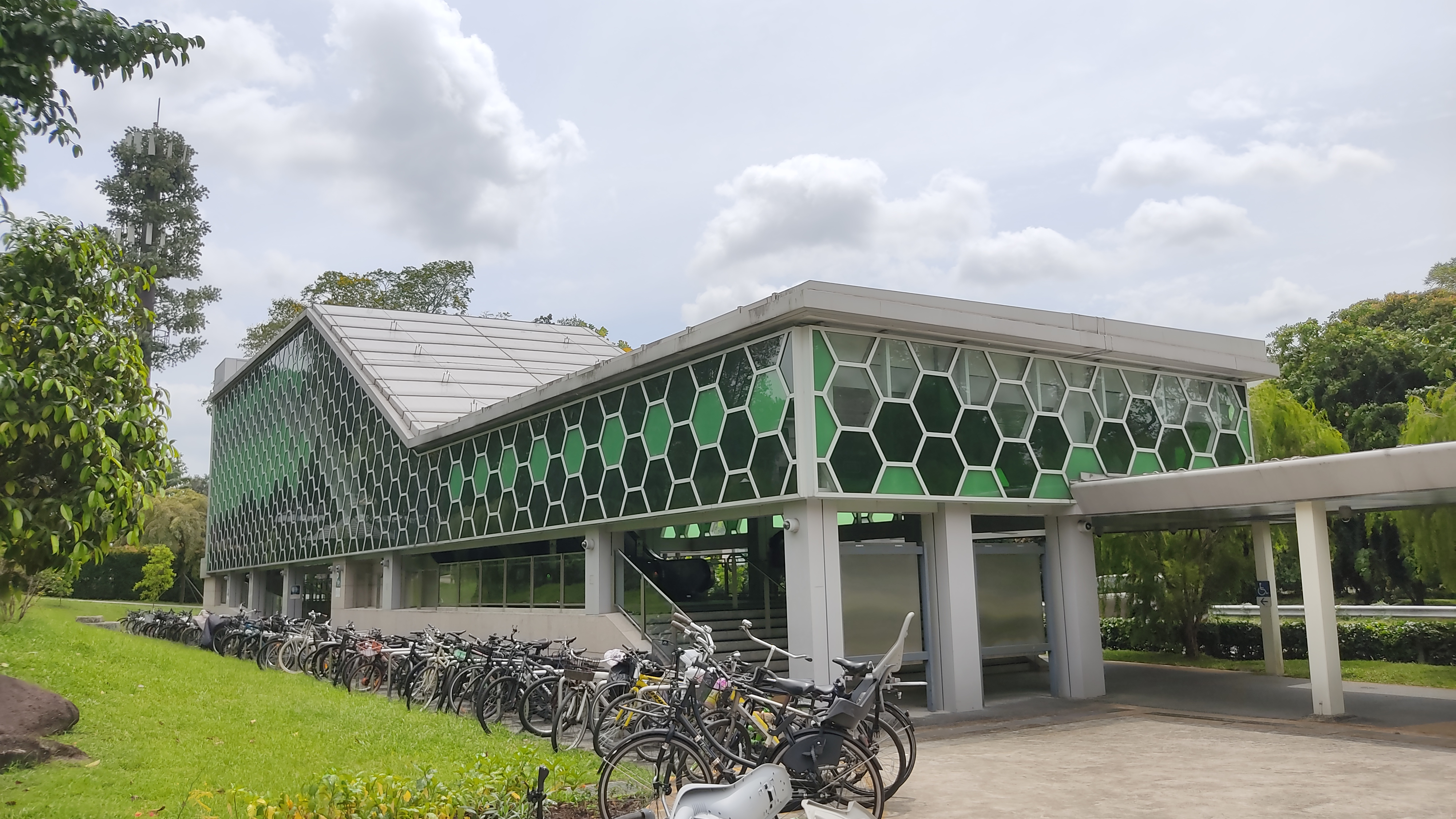
A pedestrian overhead bridge linking to Exit B of the station

Designed by the architectural firms of SAA Architects and Ong & Ong, the station was intended to be a grand yet compelling structure, reflecting the youthful ingenuity of the students while also being mindful of the historical background. Additionally, the station was designed to accompany the existing greenery in the area. The station has an "open, park-like" setting with clear geometric lines and green geometric panels giving the station a contemporary impression. The entrances are designed with an overarching canopy to highlight the design theme of "nature and flow". The critical structures of the station – the pedestrian bridge, ventilation shafts and covered linkway – converge at the main entrance, rotated around a pivot. Vertical plants and planter boxes are placed around the station. The forms and textures of the station, which has random and orderly patterns of blocks, were inspired by the popular game Jenga.

=== Station artwork ===
As part of the MRT network's Art-in-Transit Programme, (Note: Public art showcase which integrates artworks into the MRT network) two murals created by HCI students were commissioned for Tan Kah Kee station – Gratitude (named 饮水思源 in Chinese) and Resilience (自强不息). The artworks consist of handwritten text regarding determination (for Resilience) or appreciation of those of the past and present (for Gratitude). The texts for Resilience, when viewed from afar, dissolve into bands of white and yellow, creating what appears to be a "blazing sun" that shines throughout any circumstances. Gratitude, characterised by its motifs of stormy waves, was intended to reflect the principle of giving back to society, "connecting" everyone to the rich history and cultural heritage of the area.

== Notes and references ==
=== Bibliography ===
- Feng, Zengkun (2017). Downtown Line: Soaring to new heights (PDF). Singapore: Straits Times Press Pte Ltd. ISBN 978-981-4747-66-0. OCLC 1003852882.
