= Masjid Al-Huda =

Mosque located in Sixth Avenue, Singapore

- Jawi: مسجد الهدى
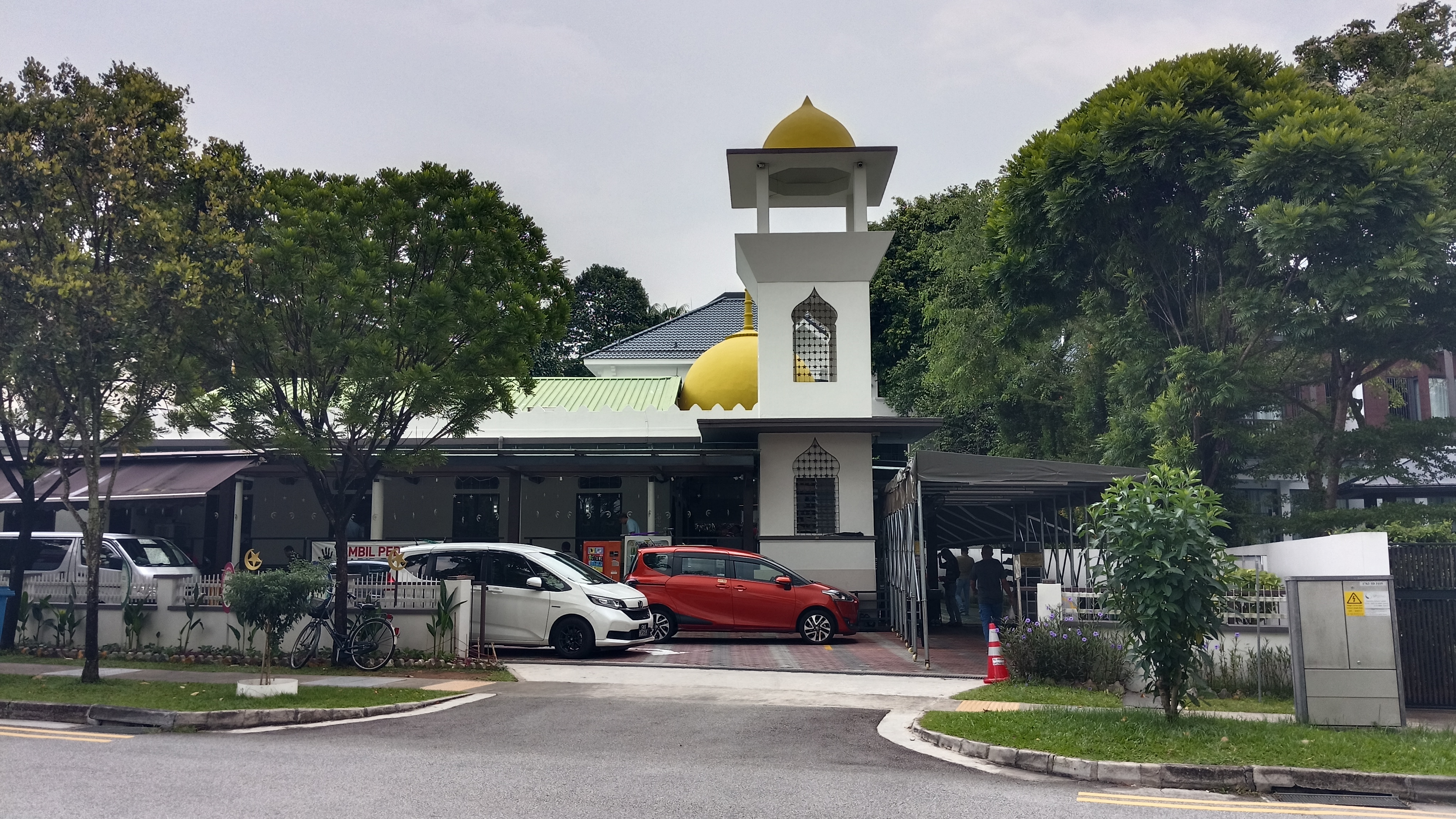

- Location in Singapore

Religion
- Affiliation: Sunni Islam

Location
- Location: 34 Jalan Haji Alias, Singapore 268534
- Country: Singapore
- Coordinates: 1.3232320°N 103.7949550°E

Architecture
- Type: Mosque
- Style: Islamic architecture
- Founder: Abdul Halim Karto
- Completed: 1925 (surau); 1966 (mosque)

Specifications
- Dome: 1
- Minaret: 1

Masjid Al-Huda, formerly known as Masjid Coronation, is a mosque located in the Sixth Avenue district of Bukit Timah, Singapore. Originating as a surau in 1925, it has been rebuilt thrice and is part of the Bukit Timah Heritage Trail, with its main congregants coming from Bukit Timah, Sixth Avenue and Holland Road. Within the mosque are the Alias Villas, two landed houses which are owned by the mosque.

== Etymology ==
The phrase "Al-Huda" is an Arabic term which refers to being on the rightly guided path.

== History ==
The original structure at the site was a surau that was built in 1925 as an awqaf by Abdul Halim bin Karto, a qāḍī and Muslim nobleman. The land which the surau was erected on was originally purchased by Karto from a Hindu landlord, Navena Choona Narainan Chitty. The surau was converted into a larger structure and reopened as a mosque, Masjid Coronation, in 1965. After the mosque had fallen into the purview of the Majlis Ugama Islam Singapura (MUIS), the mosque was renamed to Masjid Al-Huda. The newly renamed mosque served the residents of the Kampong Tempeh village until it was cleared in the 1980s to make way for the redevelopments in Sixth Avenue. In July 1999, the mosque was closed down for structural repair works, which were completed in August of that same year.

Masjid Al-Huda was rebuilt in 2015 as part of a project to expand the existing mosque as well as improve its ventilation, sanitary facilities and ablution areas. The total cost for the reconstruction was $1.1 million. The newly rebuilt mosque was also marked as a site of the Bukit Timah Heritage Trail that was organized by the National Heritage Board. In 2025, the mosque launched a free Islamic education program for underprivileged Muslim families, as part of a celebration of the 100th anniversary of the mosque.

== Architecture ==
Masjid Al-Huda is built in a traditional Malay style and features wooden elements in its construction. The prayer hall of the mosque is square in layout and is fully carpeted, with the pulpit carved from wood. At the side of the mosque is a heritage gallery which details the history of the mosque as well as artifacts of Malay and Muslim culture.

Within the mosque compound are two terraced houses, known as the Alias Villas. They feature tiered roofs inspired by Minangkabau architecture and contemporary modernized Malay styles.

== Transportation ==
Masjid Al-Huda is situated along Jalan Haji Alias, a road which is served by two bus stops that lead to either Holland Road or the Sixth Avenue MRT station.

== See also ==
- Islam in Singapore
- List of mosques in Singapore
