= Sixth Avenue MRT station =

Mass Rapid Transit station in Singapore

Sixth Avenue DT7 第六道 சிக்ஸ்த் அவென்யூ
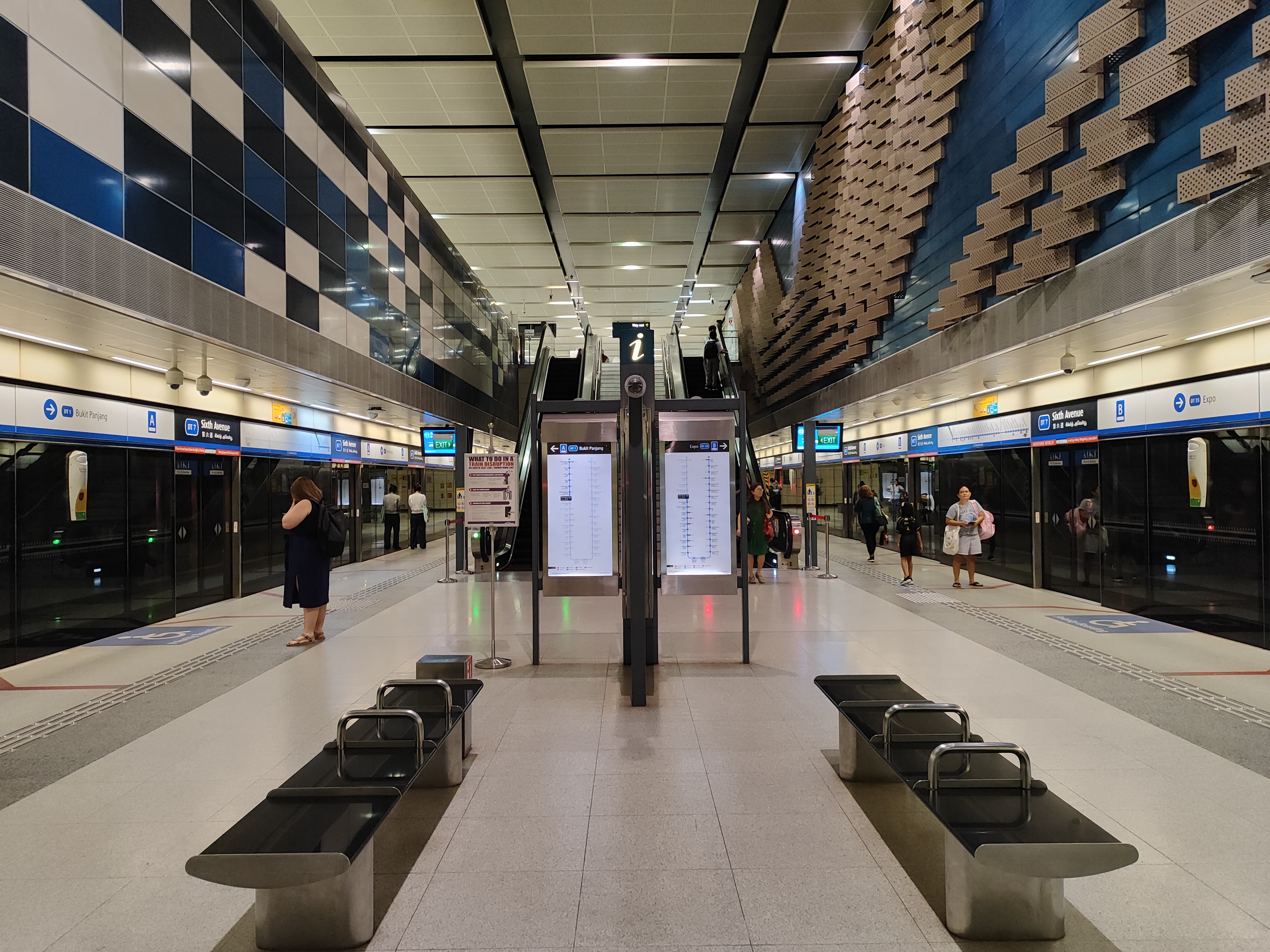
- Platform level of Sixth Avenue MRT station

General information
- Location: 777 Bukit Timah Road, Singapore 269784
- Coordinates: 01°19′51″N 103°47′51″E
- System: Mass Rapid Transit (MRT) station
- Owner: Land Transport Authority
- Operator: SBS Transit
- Line: Downtown Line
- Platforms: 2 (1 island platform)
- Tracks: 2
- Connections: Bus, Taxi

Construction
- Structure type: Underground
- Platform levels: 1
- Accessible: Yes

Other information
- Station code: SAV

History
- Opened: 27 December 2015; 10 years ago
- Former names: Eng Neo, Bukit Timah

Passengers
- June 2024: 3,658 per day

Services
Preceding station	Mass Rapid Transit	Following station
King Albert Park towards Bukit Panjang	Downtown Line	Tan Kah Kee towards Expo
Track layout
Location
- Location within Singapore Rail

Sixth Avenue MRT station is an underground Mass Rapid Transit (MRT) station on the Downtown Line in Bukit Timah, Singapore. The station is located along Bukit Timah Road and was named after Sixth Avenue, a nearby road which connects Bukit Timah Road and Holland Road.

== History ==
Contract 917 was awarded to Alpine Bau GmbH (Singapore Branch) for the Design and Construction of Sixth Avenue and King Albert Park stations and tunnels at S$320.7 million. Alpine Bau went bankrupt in mid-2013. Subsequently, completion of the station was handed over to McConnell Dowell under Contract 917A. On 28 June 2015, Transport Minister Lui Tuck Yew announced that the delay was "completely resolved" by the authorities and Stage 2's opening date was reverted to 27 December that year.

== Station details ==
Sixth Avenue's name was retained from its working name in July 2008, and was selected through a public poll in July 2009, which also included the names "Eng Neo" and "Bukit Timah".

The station is the only Downtown Line station not to feature public art as part of the Art-in-Transit Programme.

=== Location ===
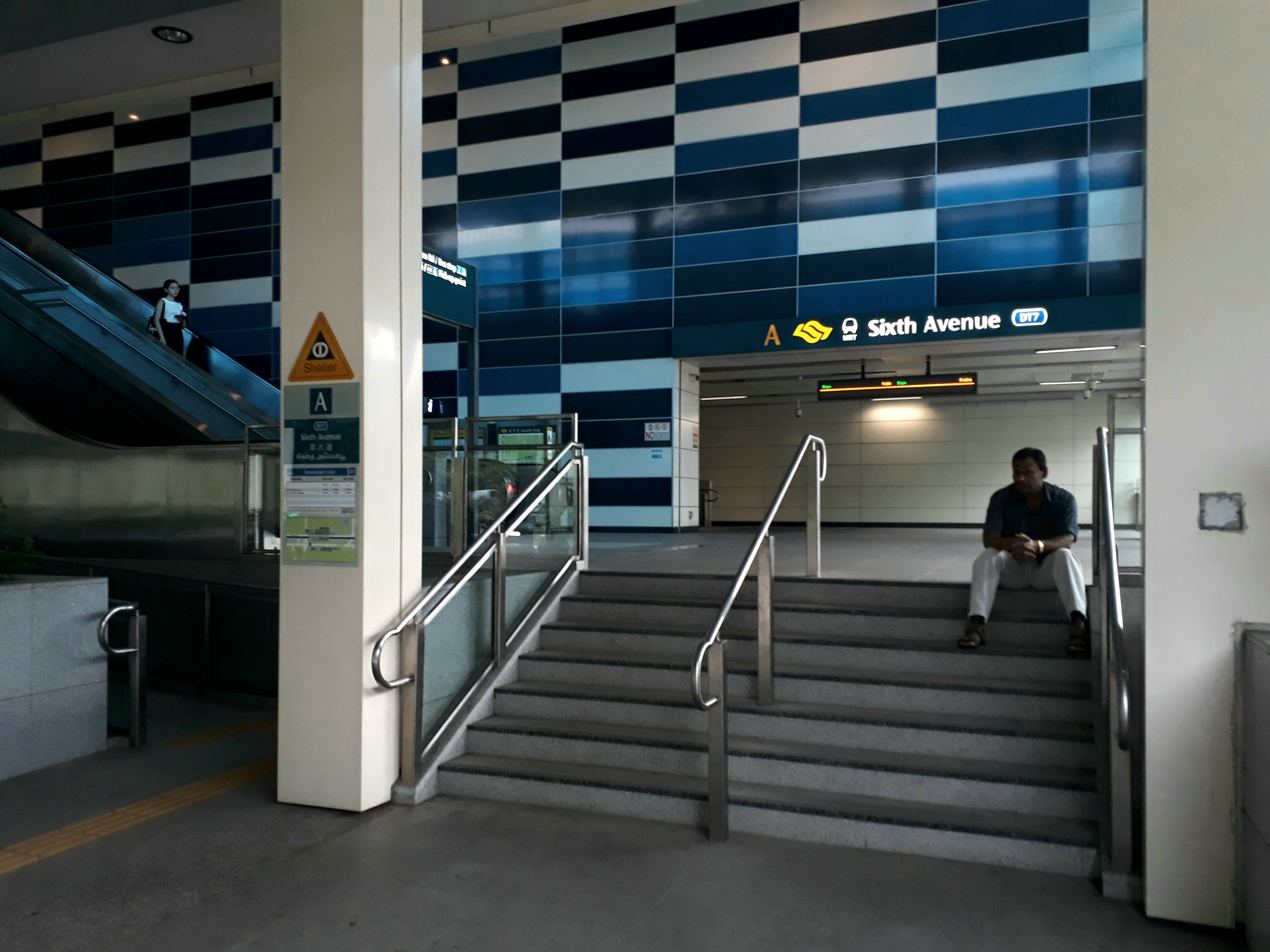
Exit A of Sixth Avenue station.

The station is located along Bukit Timah Road underneath the traffic junctions with Eng Neo Avenue and Fourth Avenue. It was described by the media as the first MRT station to be located within a private residential area. The station has two ground-level exits; Exit A is the ground-level entrance to the station and is located along Bukit Timah Road, serving locations such as Fifth Avenue Condo, Guthrie House, Royalville, Second Avenue Junction, Sixth Avenue Centre, Sixth Avenue Ville and Soo's Nursing Home. Exit B is connected to the station via an overhead bridge and is located along Dunearn Road, serving locations such as Eton House Pre-School, Jalan Naga Sari, Nanyang Girls' High School, National Junior College and Vanda Estate.

=== Services ===
Sixth Avenue station is a station on the Downtown Line (DTL) and is situated between the King Albert Park and Tan Kah Kee stations. The station code is DT7, as reflected on official maps. The station operates between 5:42 am and 12:36 am daily.
