= Telok Blangah =

Housing estate, neighbourhood and planning area in Singapore

- Subzone of Bukit Merah Planning Area & Housing Estate

Other transcription(s)
  - Chinese: 直落布兰雅
  - Pinyin: Zhíluò Bùlányǎ
  - Malay (Rumi): Teluk Belanga
  - Malay (Jawi): تلوق بلاڠا
  - Tamil: தெலுக் பிளாங்கா
- Interactive map of Telok Blangah

Telok Blangah (IPA: /ˈtəloʊk ˌblɑːŋɑː/ TUH-lohk BLAHNG-ah, Chinese: 直落布兰雅, Tamil: தெலுக் பிளாங்கா) is a subzone and housing estate within Bukit Merah, Singapore.

== Etymology ==
The words "Telok Blangah" is Malay in origin, being a compound of two Malay words, with Telok meaning "bay" and Blangah being an alternative variant name of the Tapayan, a kind of stone pot or vessel. British colonial authorities rendered the name of the subzone as "Tulluh Blangan."

== History ==
The name "Telok Blangah" first appeared in the journals of Wang Dayuan, a Chinese traveller who had explored much of Asia including Singapore, at the time known as Temasek. After Singapore had been established as a colonial protectorate under British suzerainty, the authorities granted ownership of Telok Blangah to the Temenggong of Johor in 1824, during the Treaty of Friendship and Alliance signed by Temenggong Abdul Rahman, Sultan Hussain Shah, and John Crawfurd. The rulership of Singapore under the Temenggong was hence restricted to Telok Blangah and the borders of Tanjong Pagar, effectively removing the Temenggong and his followers from the central parts of the country. By 1825, the official residence of the reigning Temenggongs was constructed in Telok Blangah. A mountain within the area, Telok Blangah Hill, was renamed to Mount Faber in 1845 in honour of a British captain, Charles Edward Faber.

In the present day, the boundaries of Telok Blangah are defined as being the land that is situated behind the Keppel Harbour, between West Coast Highway and the Ayer Rajah Expressway, while being bordered by the Alexandra and Bukit Purmei planning areas on both left and right sides. In addition to that, Telok Blangah is divided into five smaller subzones of housing estates, which are Telok Blangah Way, Telok Blangah Heights, Telok Blangah Rise, Telok Blangah Crescent and Telok Blangah Drive; all of which surround Mount Faber and the Telok Blangah Hill Park next to said mountain.

A plot of land with the address 30 Telok Blangah Road is owned by the State of Johor, although local law enforcement still takes precedence. This plot of land contains both a congregational mosque and royal cemetery which are still active and under the purview of the Islamic council of Johor. Another Islamic cemetery near the area, the Keramat Bukit Kasita, is unofficially owned by nobility from Johor, although this is not reflected in official documents, with noble families hiring a caretaker to look after the site.

== Landmarks ==
=== Singapore Cable Car ===
Inaugurated in 1974, the Singapore Cable Car is a large scale gondola lift system which allows for aerial views of not only Telok Blangah and Mount Faber, but also of Sentosa, Keppel Harbour, and the Southern Islands. It is also officially designated as a tourist attraction.

=== Marang Cemetery ===
The Marang Cemetery is a defunct, closed cemetery at the foot of Mount Faber which was once part of a former village, Kampong Marang. Notable burials in the cemetery include the grave of Abdul Hamid Marang, a co-founder of Masjid Abdul Hamid, and the grave of Abdul Halim bin Karto, a prominent civil servant and founder of Masjid Al-Huda. The cemetery can be accessed from Exit A of the Harbourfront MRT station.

=== Mausoleum of Radin Mas Ayu ===
This mausoleum is dedicated to Radin Mas Ayu, a semi-legendary Javanese princess who had fled to Temasek along with her father in order to escape persecution in her hometown. The story of Radin Mas is considered a tragedy by locals, who visit the mausoleum to pay their respects and tributes towards the deceased princess. Although the time period of said story is unknown, later adaptations of the story place it during colonial times, after the 1820s during the rule of the Temenggongs. The mausoleum is recognizable for its predominately yellow colour scheme and is regarded as a keramat as well.

== Infrastructure ==
=== Education ===
There are three primary schools, one secondary school and one college in Telok Blangah. Respectively, they are Telok Blangah Rise Primary School, CHIJ Kellock, Radin Mas Primary School, CHIJ Saint Theresa's Convent and Shelton College International. As for religious education, there is a branch of the Telok Ayer Methodist Church which also functions as a school, as well as Masjid Al-Amin which contains a madrasa.

=== Food ===
Seah Im Food Centre can be found within walking distance of the Harbourfront MRT station. With at least thirty-eight stalls, this hawker centre is a popular destination amongst both locals and tourists.
