= Bukit Purmei =

Housing estate in Singapore

- HDB Estate
- Bukit Purmei

Other transcription(s)
  - Malay: Bukit Purmei (Rumi) بوکيت ڤرماي (Jawi)
  - Chinese: 武吉宝美 (Simplified) 武吉宝美 (Traditional); Wǔjí Bǎoměi (Pinyin)
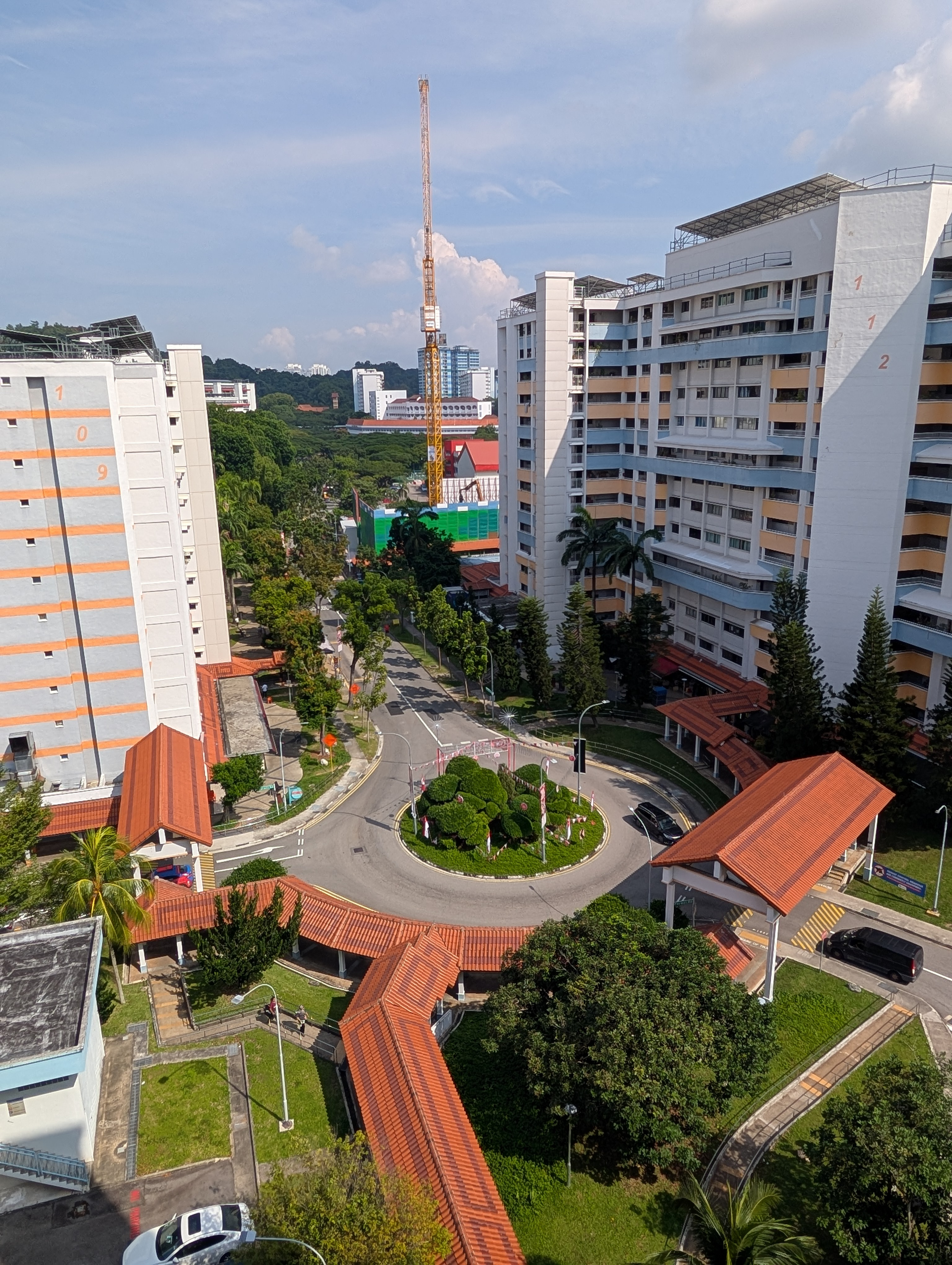
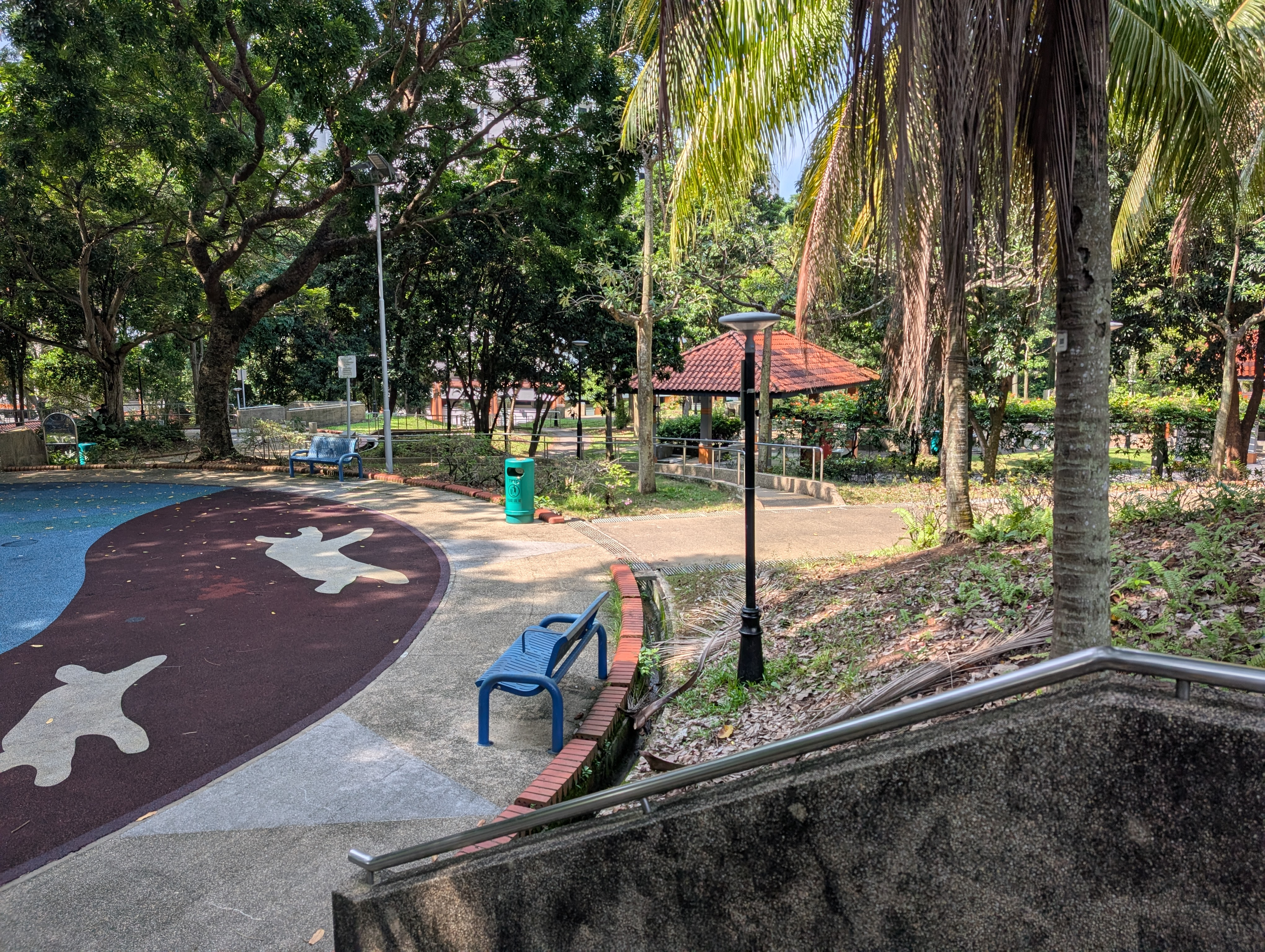
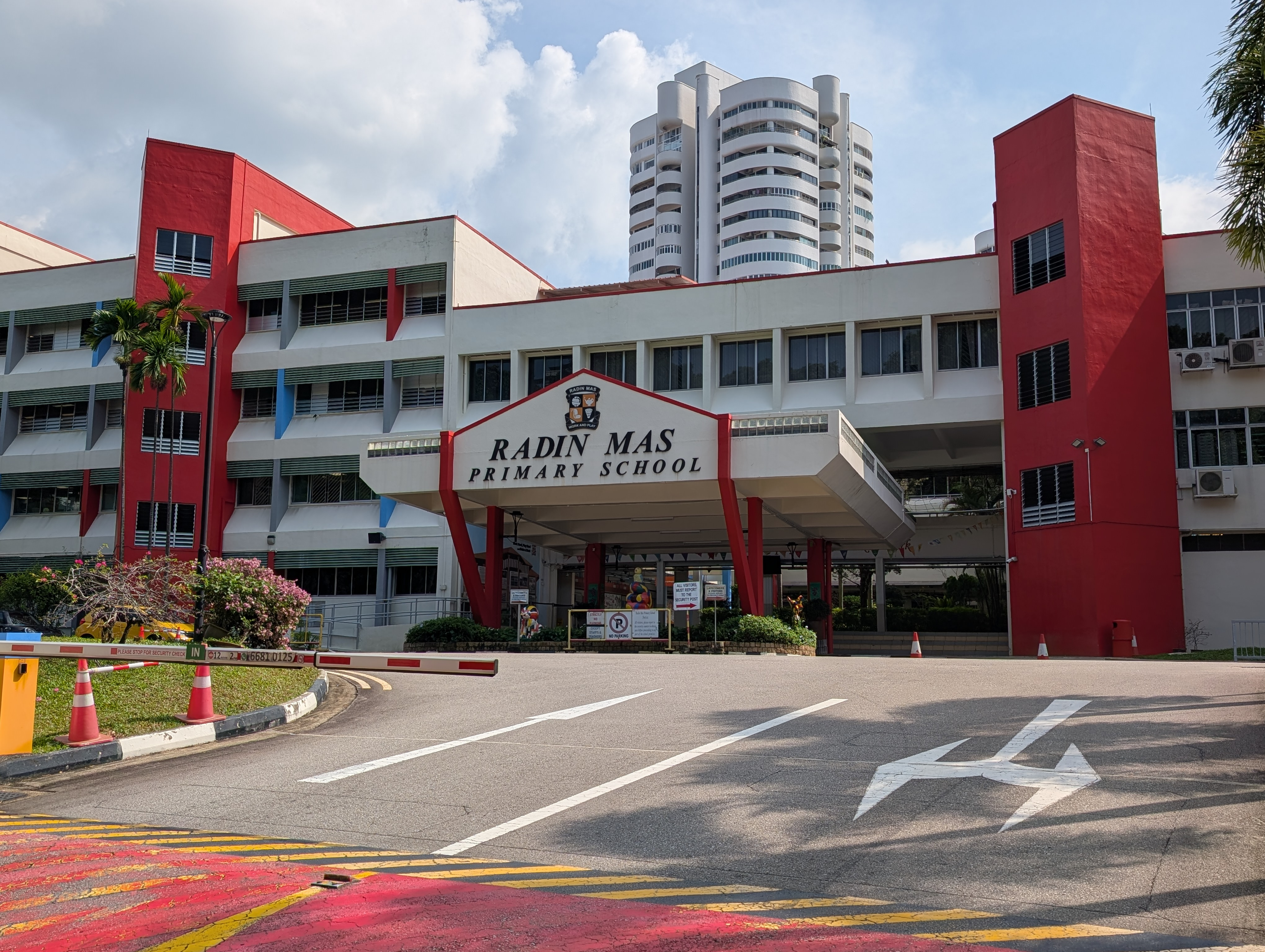
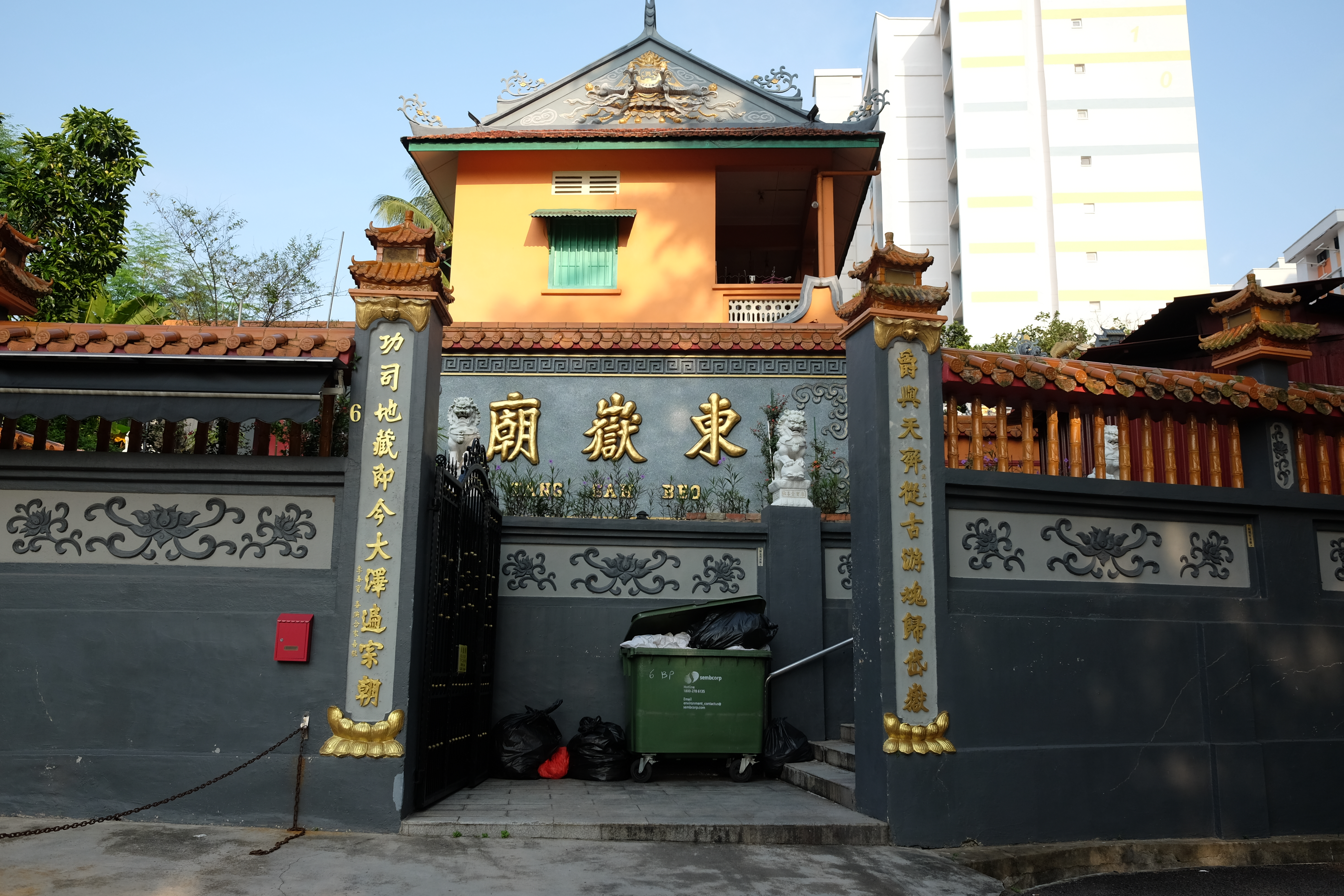
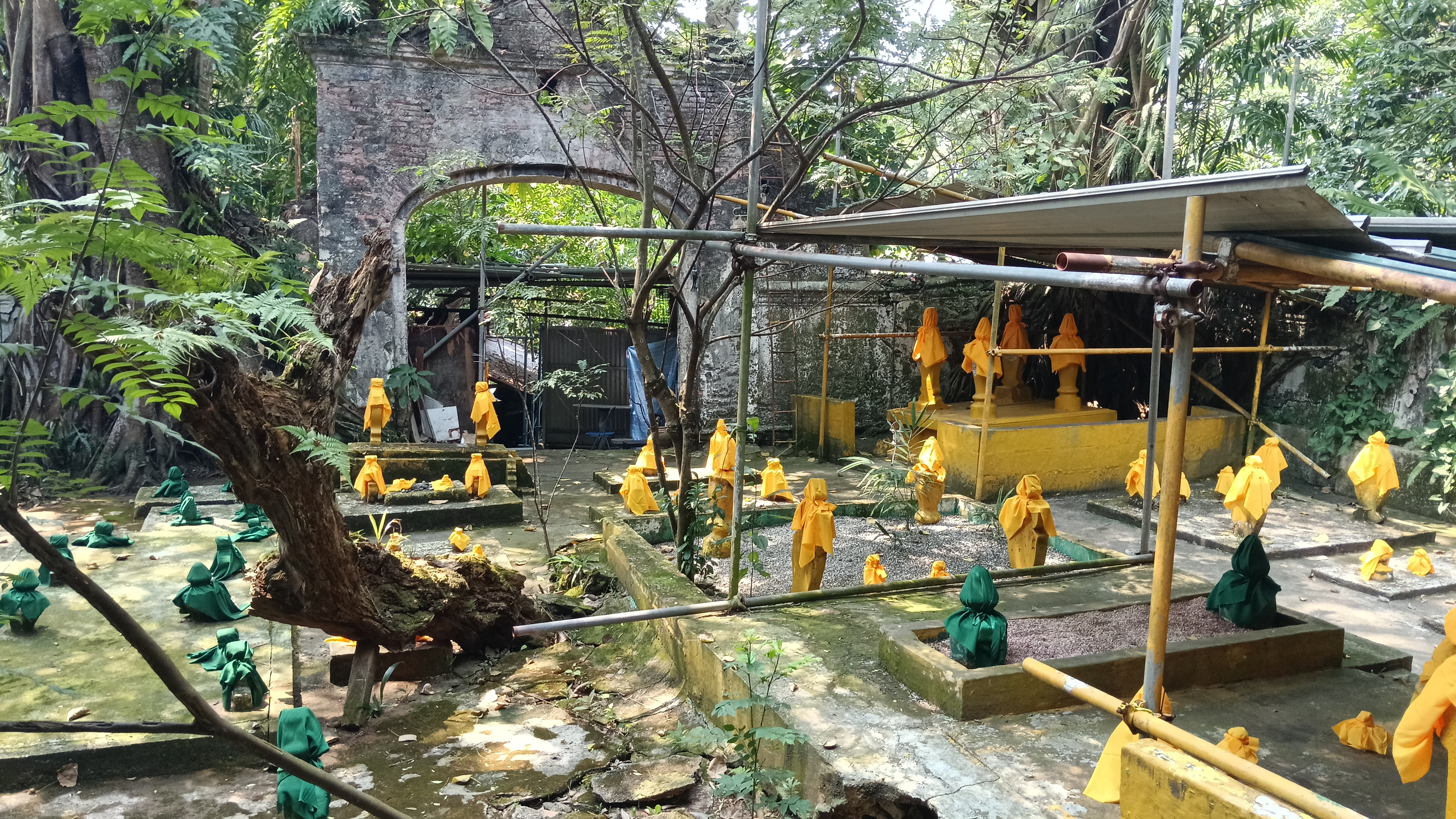
- From top left to right: Bukit Purmei Avenue, Bukit Purmei Hillock Park, Radin Mas Primary School, Tang Gah Beo, Keramat Bukit Kasita
- Interactive map of Bukit Purmei
- Bukit Purmei in Singapore
- Coordinates: 1.274169°N 103.826017°E
- Country: Singapore
- Region: Central Region
- Planning area: Bukit Merah
- CDCs: Central Singapore CDC
- Town councils: Tanjong Pagar Town Council
- Constituencies: Radin Mas SMC

Government
  - Mayors: Central Singapore CDC: Heng Chee How (24 November 2001–30 May 2009); Zainudin Nordin (31 May 2009–26 May 2011); Sam Tan (27 May 2011 – 26 May 2014); Denise Phua (27 May 2014–present)
  - Members of Parliament: Melvin Yong
- Postal districts: 09
- HDB flats: 15

Bukit Purmei (Note: IPA: /ˈbʊkɪt ˌpɜːrmaɪ/ BUUK-it PUR-mye (Chinese: 武吉宝美; pinyin: Wǔjí Bǎoměi)) is a housing estate within Bukit Merah planning area in Singapore, near Telok Blangah estate. Bukit Purmei consists of 15 HDB blocks. Construction of the flats were completed by late 1981 to 1982, and in 1997, levelling of the hill and renovations were conducted in the estate.

Within the estate, there is Bukit Purmei Hillock Park, a Chinese temple named Tang Gah Beo, and a compound containing a Muslim cemetery called Keramat Bukit Kasita.

== Etymology ==
Bukit Purmei translates to "beautiful hill", with bukit meaning "hill" and purmei meaning "beauty".

== History ==
By late 1981 to early 1982, construction of flats in Bukit Purmei was completed by the Housing Development Board, located at the foot of a hill, creating about 2300 units of houses, with 878 three-room units, 1,284 four-room units, and 135 five-room units. By 1997, it had 15 blocks of flats. Teo Lian Huay of New Nation described it as an alternative to living in Telok Blangah, which was a popularly vied for location. In 1997, an Interim Upgrading Project was conducted on Bukit Purmei, which created facilities such as parks, renovated lifts and sheltered walkways, and did some levelling on the hill.

In 1997, there were plans to rename "Bukit Purmei" as "Purmeiville", to "[capture] the new environment" according to Simon Koh, the person in charge of the Interim Upgrading Project for Bukit Purmei. However, the plans to rename it to "Purmeiville" were received with many letters of disatisfaction to The Straits Times' forum page, such as Chang Wai Tee who wrote to The Straits Times, saying that the name had historical value, and that the construction showed no care for the landscape of Bukit Purmei. Following the reaction, Koh said in 1998 that the estate will not be renamed.

In November 1999, Bukit Purmei Hillock Park was vandalised, such as by defacing barbecue pits and breaking water pipes. It was formerly a dim location for drug trafficking activities. Volunteer residents, around the size of 39 people, were gathered by Lee Yew Lee, chairman of the residents' committee in Bukit Purmei, to keep a watch on vandals and do cleaning.

== Landmarks ==
=== Tang Gah Beo ===
Tang Gah Beo, a Taoist temple, named after the Dong Yue Mountain, a sacred mountain in China, and was gazetted for conservation in June 2014. According to Alyssa Woo of The Straits Times, it is believed to be built in the 20th century by Biyu, a Buddhist from Fujian. Woo describes the Chinese mythology structures atop the roof as its defining feature. The roof and the halls are built with a Teochew style and a Hokkien style, respectively, which Yeo Kang Shua, an assistant professor in architecture from the Singapore University of Technology and Design, describes as surprising.

=== Keramat Bukit Kasita ===
Keramat Bukit Kasita is a compound surrounded by heavy foliage, comprising a Muslim burial ground named Tanah Kubur Diraja, containing about 200 tombs belonging to the Johor sultanate. According to Melody Zaccheus of The Straits Times, some accounts describe it having been opened by 1530 by Sultan Alaudin Riayat Shah II, the seventh descendant of Sang Nila Utama, but John Miksic, a historian and archaelogist from the National University of Singapore said that it dates to the early to mid-19th century. By 2023, it was assigned as a reserve site by the Urban Redevelopment Authority, and has a caretaker, housing about cats, rabbits, and roosters. As of 2013, it received about 50 visitors monthly. As of 2021, an elderly woman, who calls herself a "spirit healer", lives in the compound since the 1990s, who suffers from health and cat-hoarding problems, owning 30 cats.
