= Radin Mas Ayu =

Javanese noblewoman and semi-legendary figure (d. 1855)

Radin Mas Ayu Radin Dumu binte Radin Kesuma
- The tomb of Radin Mas Ayu at Mount Faber.
- Died: 1885; Telok Blangah, Singapore
- Occupations: Noblewoman, royal wife/mistress of Ungku Khalid
- Years active: 19th century
- Known for: See below

Radin Dumu binte Radin Kesuma (d. 1885), best known as Radin Mas Ayu, or simply Radin Mas, was a noblewoman from Java who lived in the 19th century. She was a romantic partner of Ungku Khalid, the brother of Abu Bakar of Johor. Radin Mas Ayu is more well-known for being the main character in a fictional, folkloric story that ends in a tragedy involving her death. Her tomb on Mount Faber is a tourist attraction.

== Etymology ==
The name "Radin Mas Ayu" is a Javanese phrase which literally translates to "Princess of Gold."

== Biography ==
The grave of Radin Mas Ayu in her mausoleum.

The real name of Radin Mas Ayu was Radin Dumu binte Radin Kesuma, with "Radin Mas Ayu" being either a title or nickname. She lived in the 19th century and was a contemporary of Temenggong Abdul Rahman, the third Temenggong of Johor from the Bendahara dynasty. An interview with one of her contemporaries, a villager named Haji Abu Bakar, was conducted in 1986 which revealed that Radin Mas was a Javanese noblewoman who was originally married to a Dutchman but later divorced him in the 1870s and then entered into a civil partnership with Ungku Khalid, son of Temenggong Daeng Ibrahim. However, it was a short-lived relationship, as Radin Mas died in 1885. She was buried on a hill below Mount Faber as it was considered sacrilegious to bury her at the Makam Diraja Johor Telok Blangah, due to a claim that she was not a Muslim. Despite the claims that she was a non-Muslim mistress of Ungku Khalid, she herself was a convert to Islam, studying the religion under a scholar named Kyai Ibrahim.

The grave of Radin Mas was eventually regarded as a keramat, with a brick mausoleum and shrine built over the tomb as early as the 1880s. After the formation of the Majlis Ugama Islam Singapura (MUIS) in 1968, management of the shrine was handed over to them, while a volunteer named Zainal Pak Daeng was assigned to monitor the site. Pak Daeng cleaned up the site in 1999, clearing away bushes and weeds that had overgrown across the tomb. He also hired a contractor to rebuild the shrine in 2002 into a concrete structure painted in yellow that housed both the tomb and a musalla for visitors to perform their prayers. The current shrine is now an unofficial heritage site of Telok Blangah and is a prominent site of visitation by both locals and tourists.

== Folklore ==
Radin Mas Ayu is the more famously known for being the main character of a folkloric story where she is the daughter of a Javanese nobleman named Pangeran Agung. The story begins with the marriage of Pangeran Agung with a female dancer, which results in the birth of Radin Mas. The ruling king of Java, who is Pangeran's brother, is furious at him for marrying a commoner, and sends men to kill the former dancer and Radin Mas. Radin Mas survives the assassination attempt, but her mother is killed, resulting in a fuming Pangeran breaking off his ties with the Javanese royalty and leaving Java for the island of Temasek, settling there.

The Sultan of Temasek, who is also unnamed, allows Pangeran to marry his daughter. The new stepmother of Radin Mas is jealous of her beauty and tries to frame her for injuring her son, although Pangeran still sides with his daughter. The stepmother then hatches a plan to forcibly marry Radin Mas to Tengku Bagus, her nephew, while Pangeran is thrown into a hole in the ground. At the wedding ceremony, just before the wedding can be finalized, the stepmother's son tells the crowd that Pangeran is trapped in the hole, which leads the crowd to do a massive islandwide search for him.

Purported grave of Pangeran Agung in Telok Blangah.

Once Pangeran is found, he is brought to the wedding venue. Furious, Tengku Bagus tries to stab Pangeran by throwing a dagger in his path, but Radin Mas jumps in the way of the projectile and it ends up penetrating her in the heart, killing her on the spot. The stepmother tries to escape, but is struck by lightning and dies instantly.

Another folkloric story told about Radin Mas involved her tomb being used to help a blind man.

== Legacy ==
The neighborhood of Radin Mas, Singapore is named after Radin Mas Ayu. There was also an old village mosque in Telok Blangah that was named after her, before it closed down in 2001 to make way for redevelopment works. The neighborhood is represented by the Radin Mas Single Member Constituency in the Parliament of Singapore.

== In popular culture ==
Produced by Cathay-Keris Productions and directed by L. Krishnan, Raden Mas is a 1959 tragedy drama film that adapts the story of Radin Mas Ayu, who is played by Latifah Omar. During the filming of the movie, the actors and actresses visited the shrine of Radin Mas at the foot of Mount Faber and offered prayers there. The film also gives an insight into how the tomb of Radin Mas looked like before the 2002 renovation.

Between March 1983 and June 1984, The Straits Times published a comic adaptation of the story of Radin Mas Ayu in their weekly issues. Written by Yaakub Rashid and illustrated by Alsan, each issue is two panels long and the text and captions are printed in both the English and Malay languages.

== See also ==
- Tok Lasam
- Parameswara
