= List of mausoleums in Indonesia =

Mausoleums in Indonesia in most cases are of Islamic context, with royalty and saints the dominant inhabitants. They are sometimes known as Keramat.

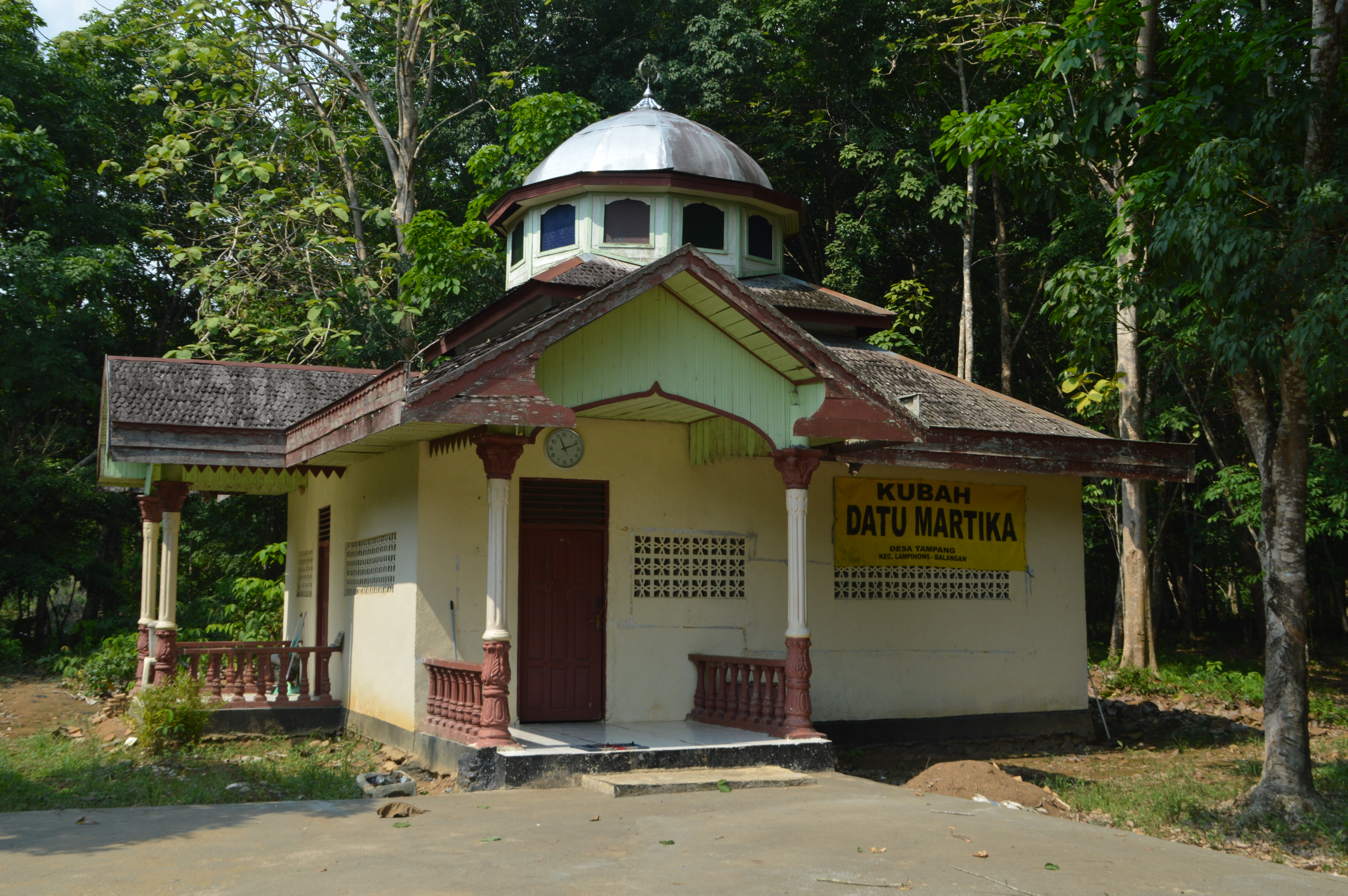
Kubah Datu Martika, a domed mausoleum and shrine of a local Muslim saint, located in South Kalimantan

== Java ==
=== Central Java ===
- Astana Giribangun, which houses the tombs of the family of Suharto, former President of Indonesia
- The tomb of Raden Patah behind the Demak Great Mosque

=== Special Capital Region of Jakarta ===
- Mausoleum O. G. Khouw, located at Petamburan Cemetery and entombs the remains of Oen Giok Khouw and his widow, Lim Sha Nio

=== Special Region of Yogyakarta ===
- Giriloyo, where the relatives of Sultan Agung of Mataram are buried
- Imogiri, a cemetery complex where the rulers of the Mataram Sultanate, the Surakarta Sunanate and also the Yogyakarta Sultanate are buried
- The royal cemetery and mosque complex located at Kotagede where some of the Mataram Sultans are buried
- Tomb of Ratu Mas Malang, where one of the queens of the Mataram Sultanate is buried

== Sumatra ==
=== North Sumatra ===
- Makam Papan Tinggi, located at Barus and contains the tomb of Shaykh Mahmud, a Tabi' and religious cleric from Yemen
- Mahligai Tomb Complex, located at Barus and contains 215 historic graves including that of a cleric named Shaykh Ruknuddin

=== Riau ===
- The Shrine of Datuk Shaykh al-Azhar, which contains a tomb of a Muslim preacher who spread Islam in the 17th century.

== Kalimantan ==
=== West Kalimantan ===
- Makam Keramat Tujuh which contains the tombs of seven Islamic missionaries, as well as some relatives of the Mataram Sultans in the adjoining cemetery

=== South Kalimantan ===
- Mausoleum of Surgi Mufti which entombs the remains of Jamaluddin al-Banjari, a local Muslim cleric and preacher who died in 1929

== See also ==
- Religion in Indonesia
- Waruga, a type of ancient burial which is no longer practiced in Indonesia
