= Shrine of Datuk Shaykh al-Azhar =

Historic shrine in Kuantan Singingi Regency, Riau, Indonesia

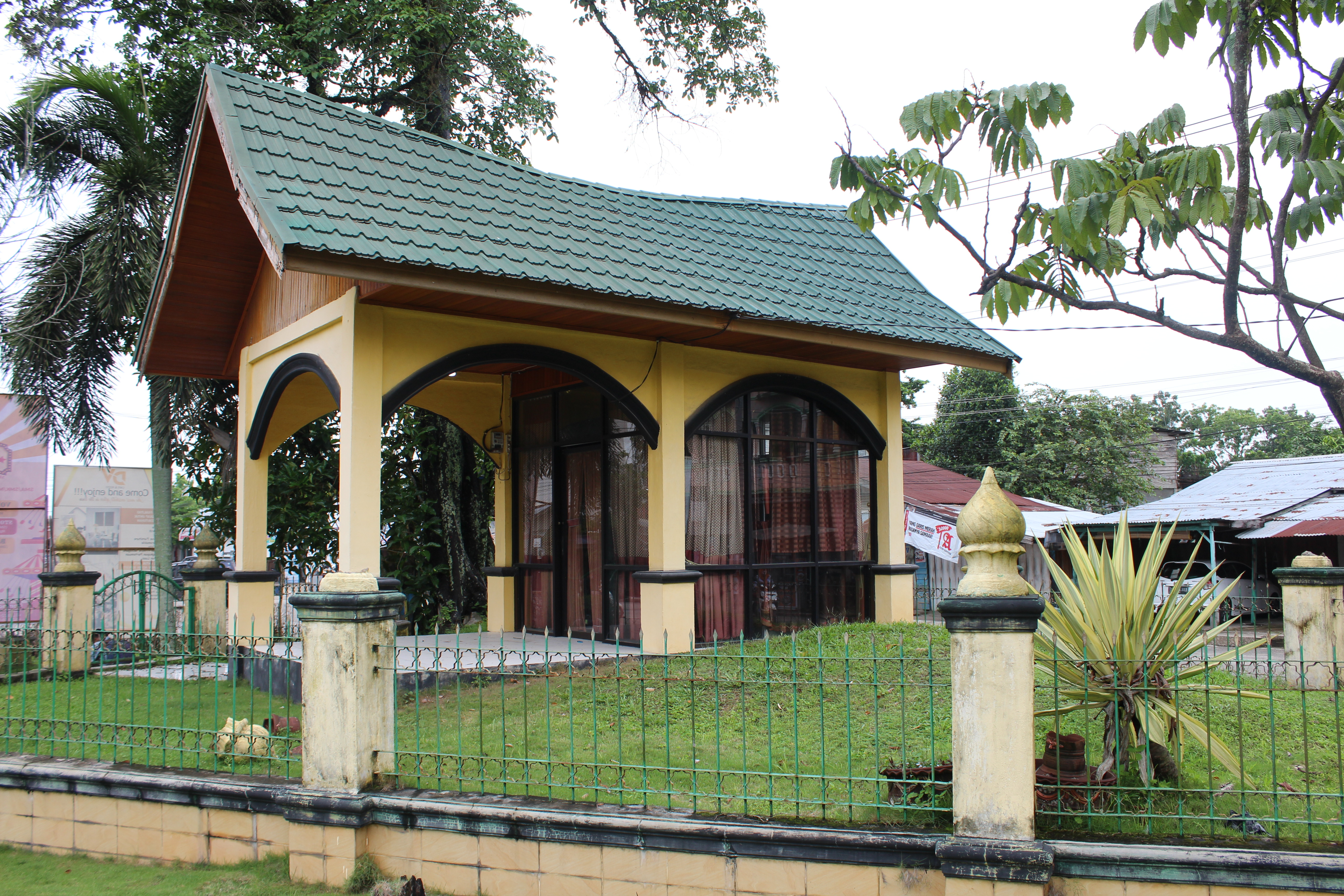

- Location within Indonesia

Religion
- Affiliation: Islam
- District: Kuantan Tengah
- Province: Riau

Location
- Location: Pasar Taluk, Indonesia
- Municipality: Kuantan Singingi Regency
- Interactive map of Shrine of Datuk Shaykh al-Azhar
- Coordinates: 0.5287350°S 101.5731244°E

The Shrine of Datuk Shaykh al-Azhar (Indonesian: Makam Datuk Keramat Syech al-Azhar) is a historic keramat shrine located on Jalan Sudirman street in the area of Pasar Taluk in Kuantan Singingi Regency, Riau, Indonesia. It contains the grave of a Sufi Muslim cleric who introduced Islam to the city of Teluk Kuantan.

== History ==
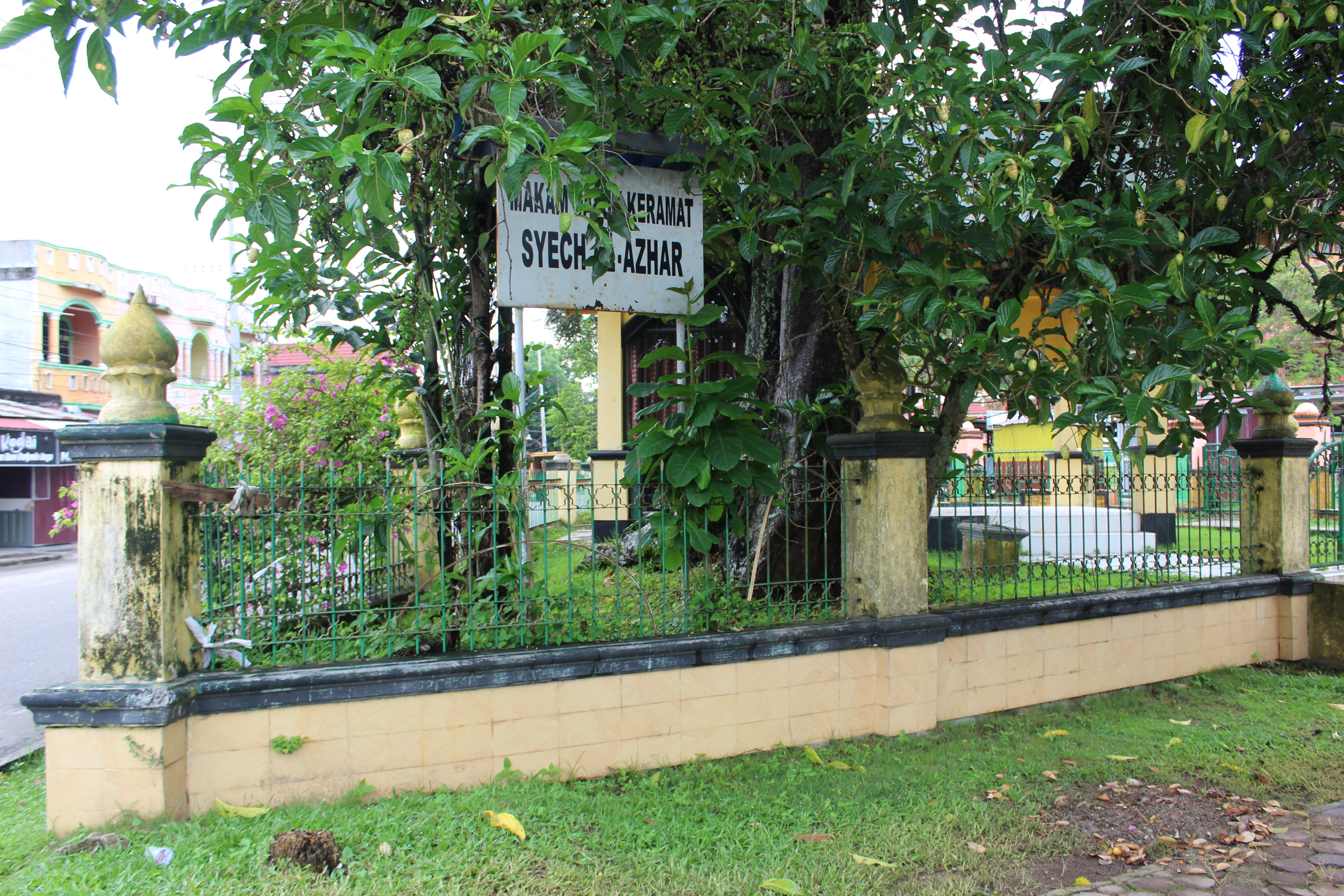
Facade of the shrine, with a tree growing in its courtyard

Shaykh al-Azhar was a Muslim Sufi of the Shattari order as well as a disciple of the renowned Sufi mystic Burhanuddin Ulakan. He was reportedly the first to introduce Islam to Teluk Kuantan; this happened in either the 17th or 18th centuries CE. Azhar was buried here, and his tomb became a well-visited pilgrimage spot for the local Shattari community. Even now, it is still visited often by both locals and tourists.

== Significance ==
The shrine holds significant cultural and religious value for the local community. It serves as a site for annual religious gatherings and Sufi rituals. The pilgrimage to the shrine is particularly popular during Islamic holidays and special commemorative events, drawing visitors from various parts of Indonesia.

== Architecture ==
The shrine's architecture reflects traditional Indonesian and Islamic styles, featuring a simple yet elegant design. The courtyard of the shrine includes a large tree, which adds to the serene and contemplative atmosphere of the site. The tomb itself is well-maintained, with regular renovations ensuring its preservation as a historical and religious landmark.

== See also ==
- Datuk Keramat
- List of mausoleums in Indonesia
