= Mausoleum of Surgi Mufti =

Tomb in South Kalimantan

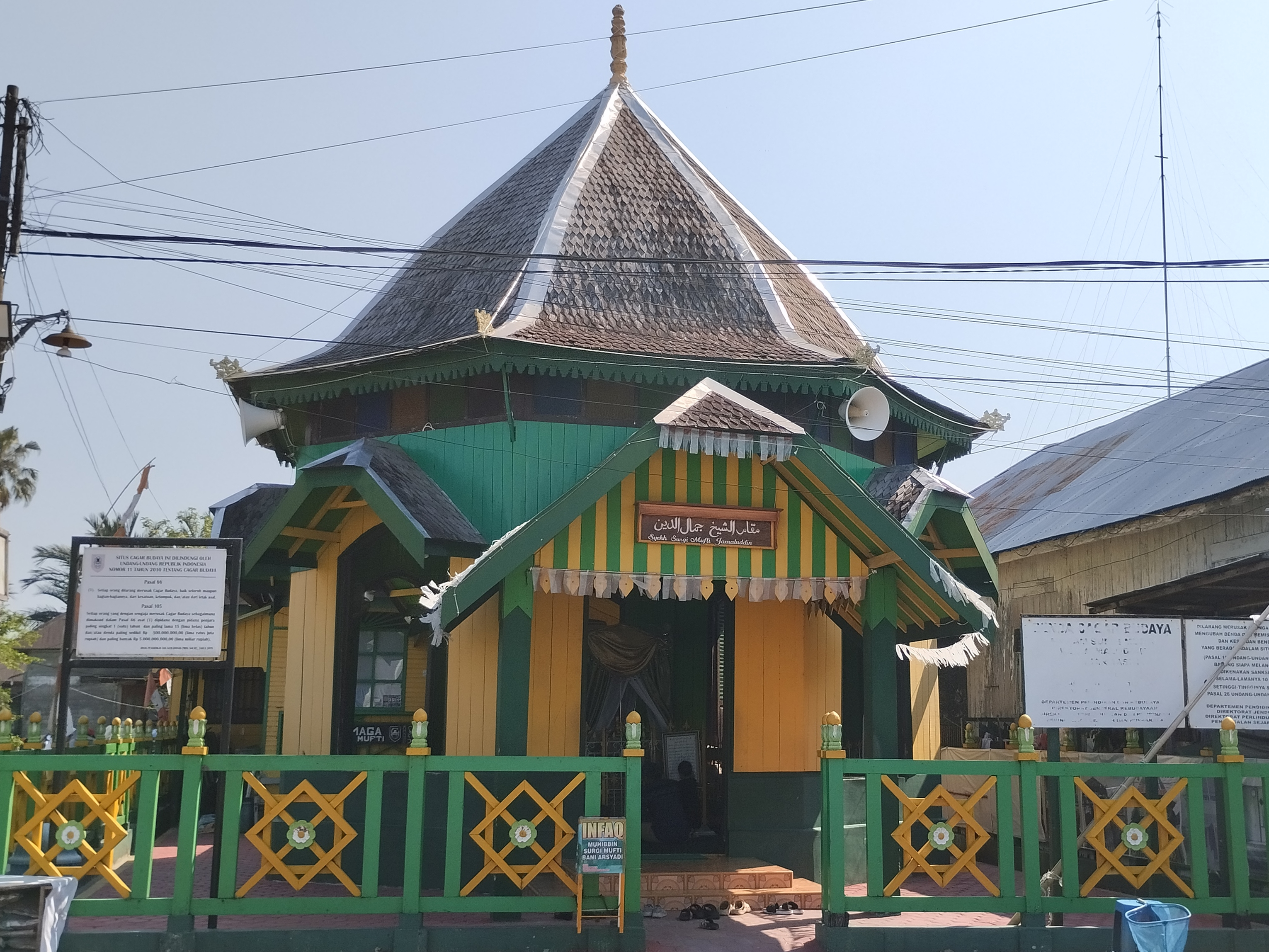

- Location within Indonesia

Religion
- Affiliation: Islam
- Province: South Kalimantan

Location
- Location: Banjarmasin, Indonesia
- Interactive map of Mausoleum of Surgi Mufti
- Coordinates: 3.3124145°S 114.5993968°E

Architecture
- Type: mausoleum
- Style: Modern

The Mausoleum of Surgi Mufti (Indonesian: Kubah Surgi Mufti) is a mausoleum located at Banjarmasin in South Kalimantan, Indonesia.

The mausoleum entombs the remains of Jamaluddin al-Banjari, a local Muslim cleric and scholar who died in 1929. The mausoleum, topped by a conical dome, is a modern structure and has three graves inside it, including that of Jamaluddin al-Banjari. Adjacent to this site is the Bani Arsyad Mosque.

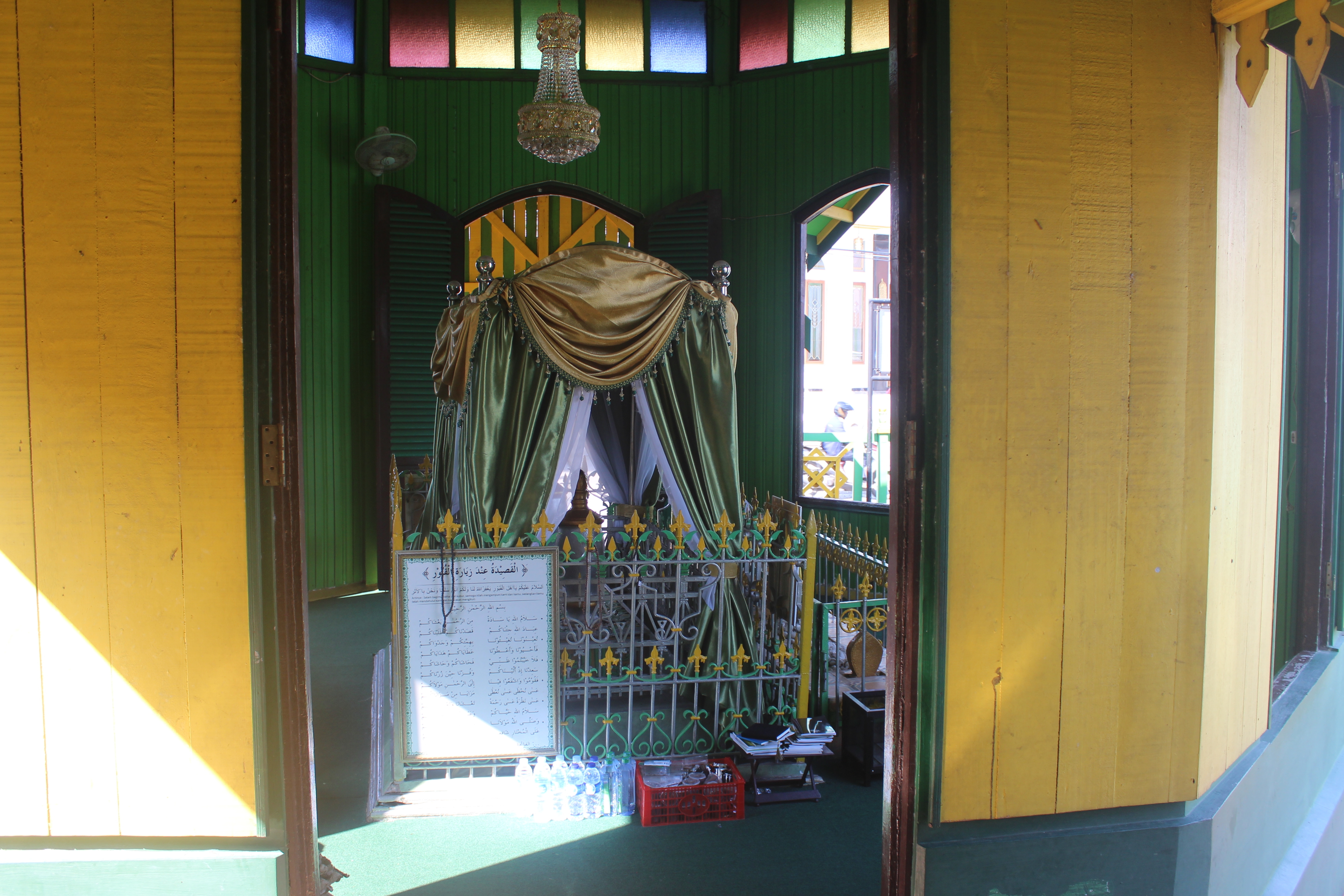
The main doorway to the mausoleum

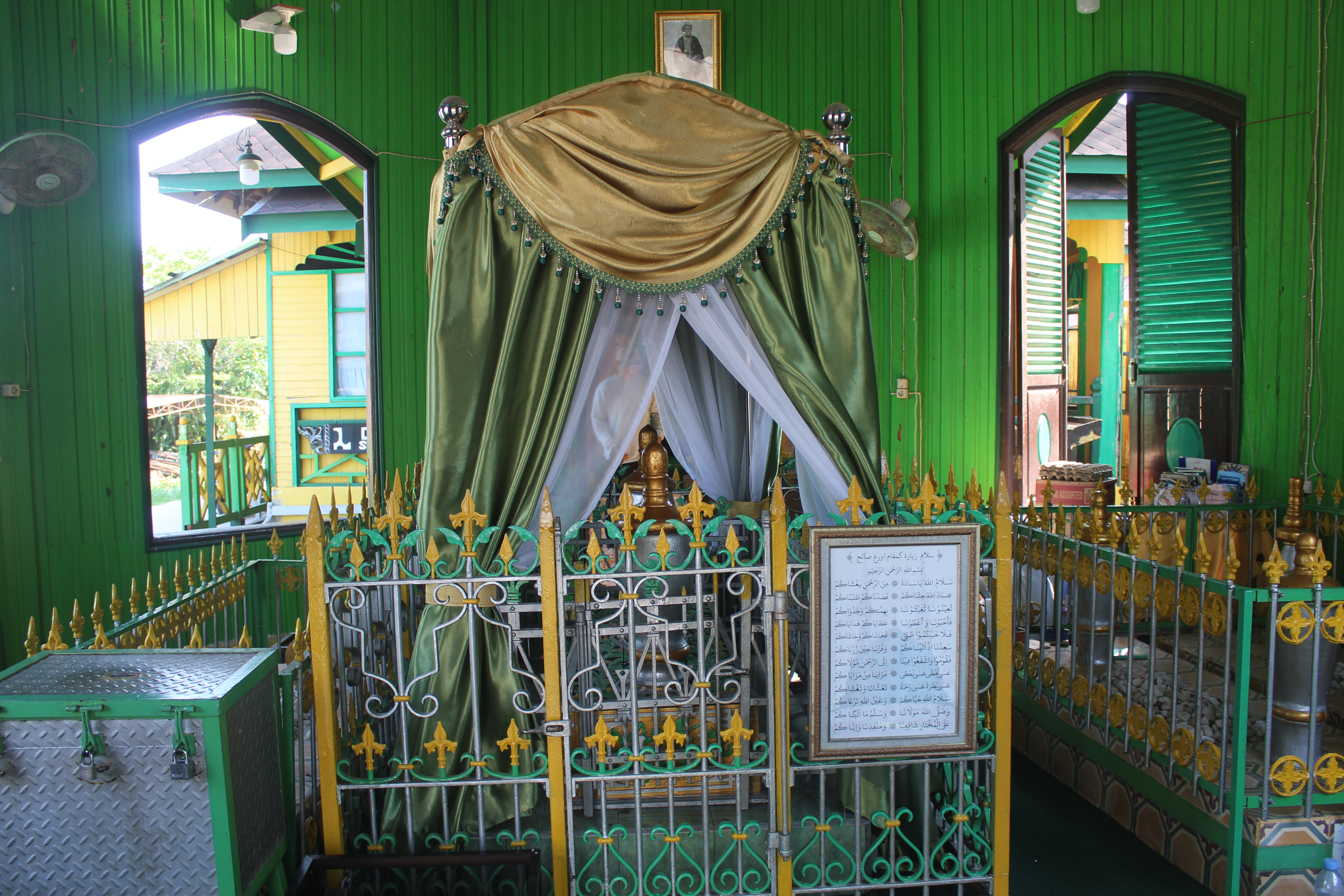
The grave of Jamaluddin al-Banjari within the mausoleum

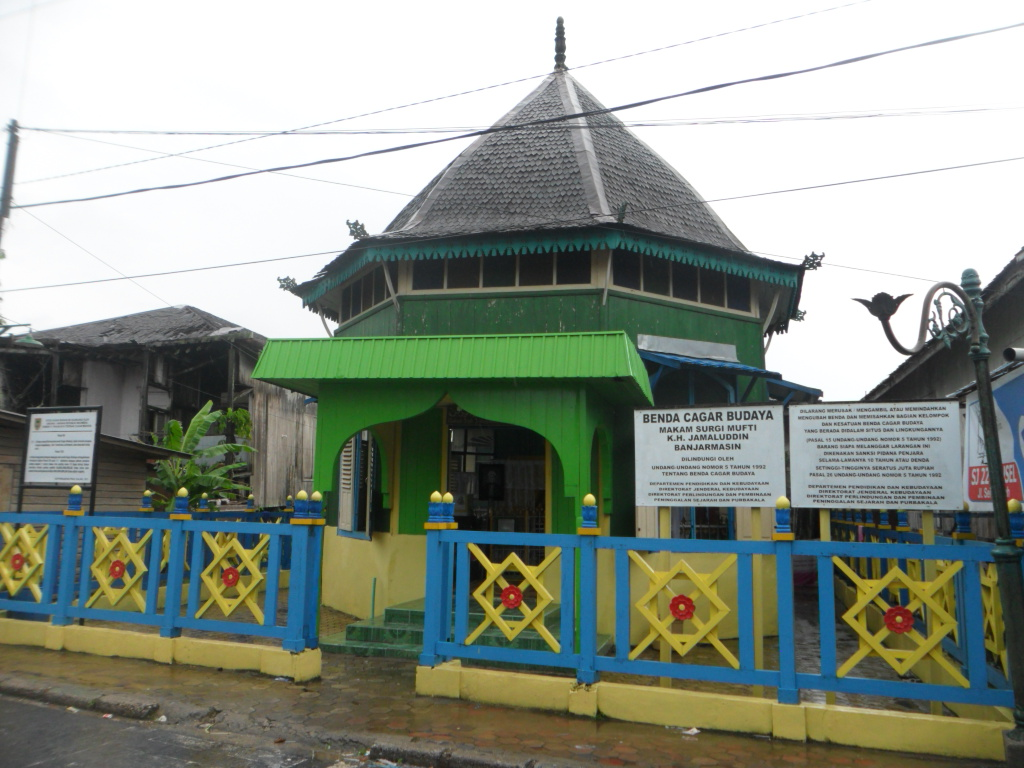
The mausoleum in 2011

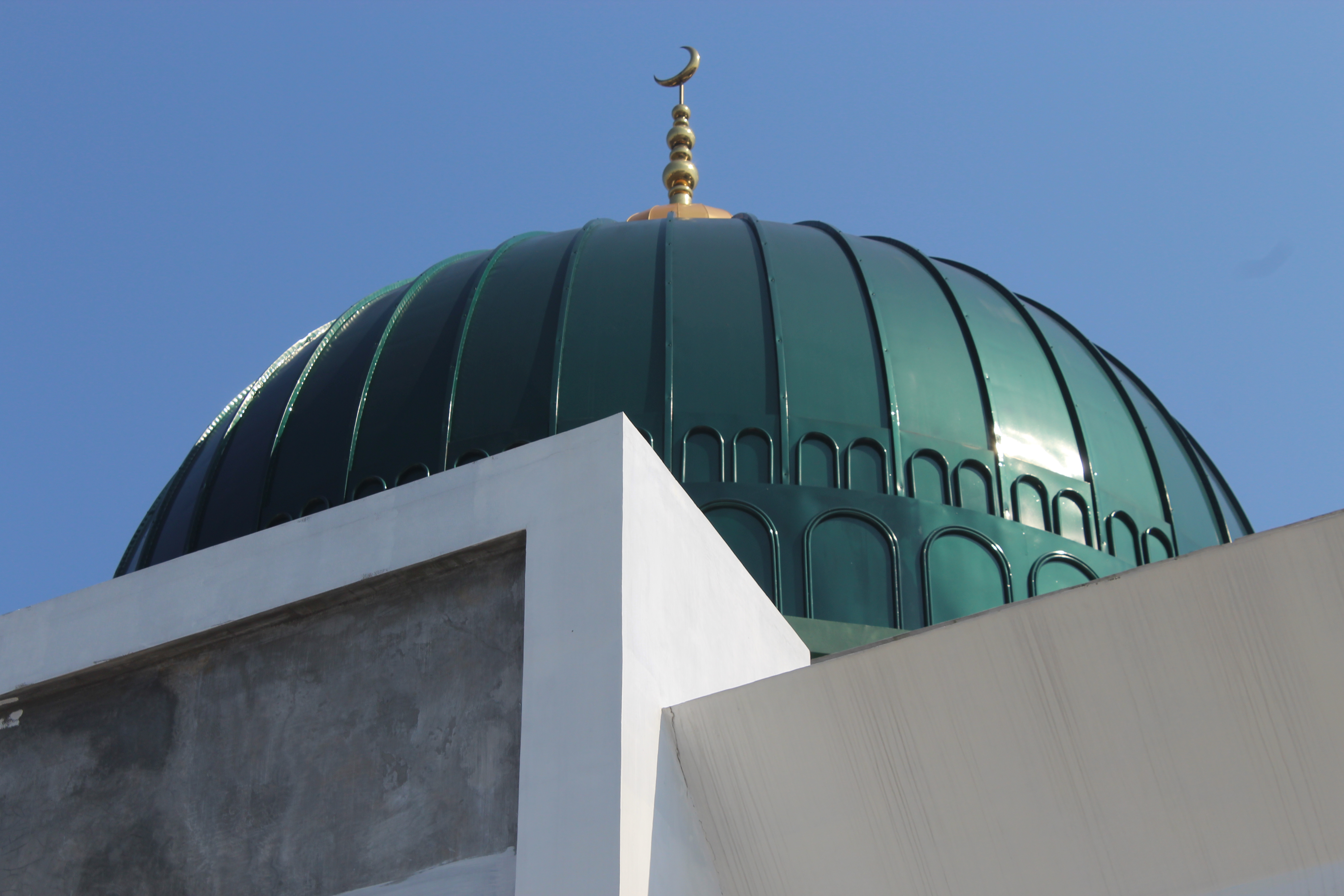
The dome of the Bani Arsyad Mosque, located next to the mausoleum

== See also ==
- Islam in Indonesia
- List of mausoleums in Indonesia
