= Tomb of Ratu Mas Malang =

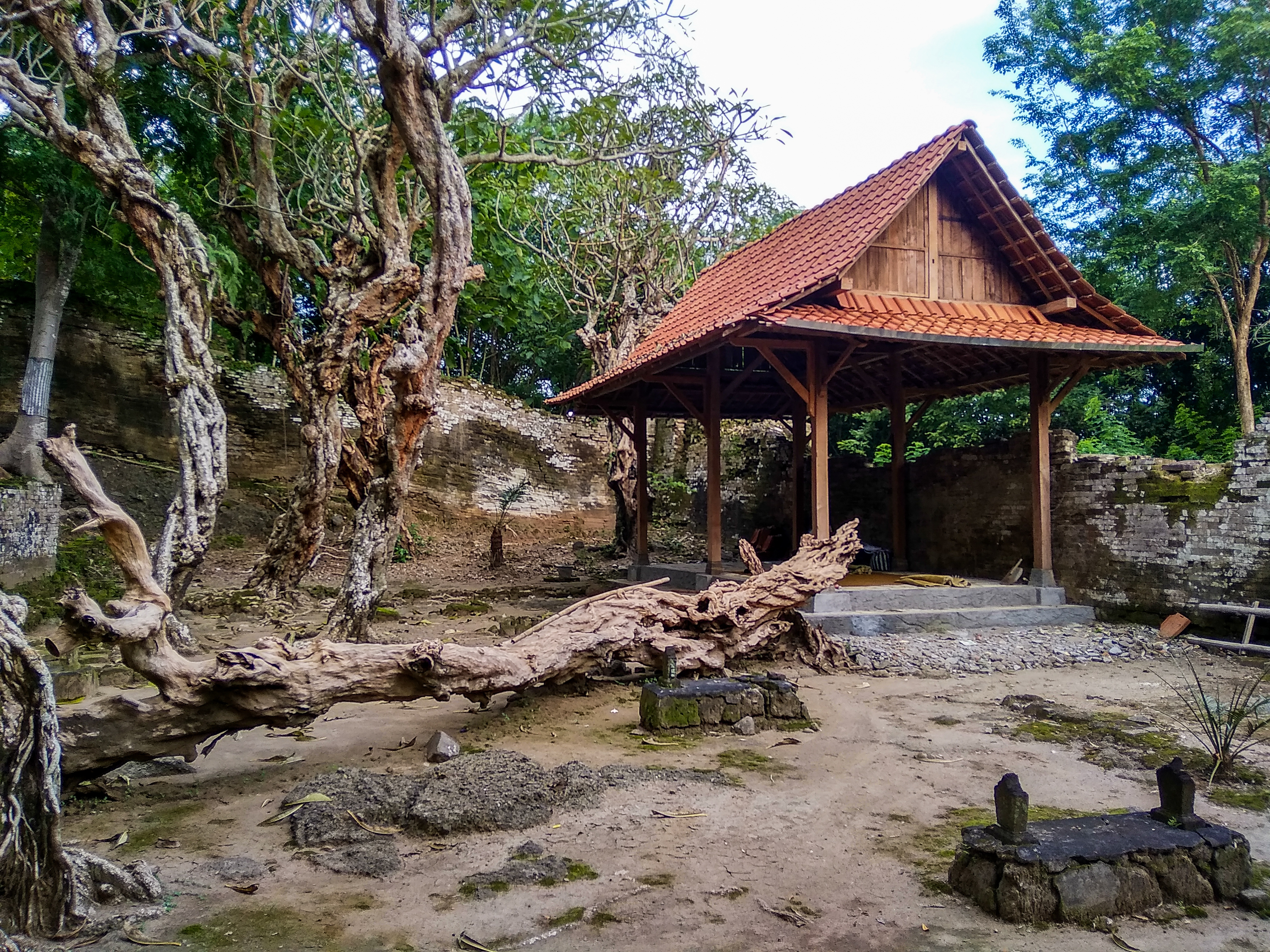
The Tomb of Ratu Mas Malang in 2020.

Tomb of Ratu Mas Malang, also known as the Antakapura Tomb (Kawi language: "palace of death" or "palace for burying the deceased") or the Mount Kelir Tomb (Javanese: ꦥꦱꦫꦺꦪꦤ꧀ꦒꦸꦤꦸꦁꦏꦼꦭꦶꦂ, romanized: Pasaréan Gunung Kelir), is a cultural heritage site from the era of Amangkurat I or Amangkurat Agung. It is located in Gunung Kelir Hamlet, Pleret Village, Pleret District, Bantul Regency, Special Region of Yogyakarta Province, Indonesia. This site is situated at the peak of Mount Sentana, approximately + 99 meters above sea level. The tomb's historical significance is tied to the figures buried here, namely Ratu Mas Malang and Ki Panjang Mas. Ratu Mas Malang was the daughter of Ki Wayah, a puppeteer of the wayang gedog tradition, and one of Amangkurat I’s consorts. Before becoming a consort, she was married to Dalang Panjang, a renowned puppeteer in the Mataram Sultanate. The tomb was constructed over approximately three years, beginning with Mas Malang’s death in 1665 and completed on 11 June 1668. The structure's walls are made of blocks of white stone, while the gravestones are crafted from andesite. Overall, the physical condition of this burial complex has deteriorated significantly, primarily due to natural factors.

== Condition ==
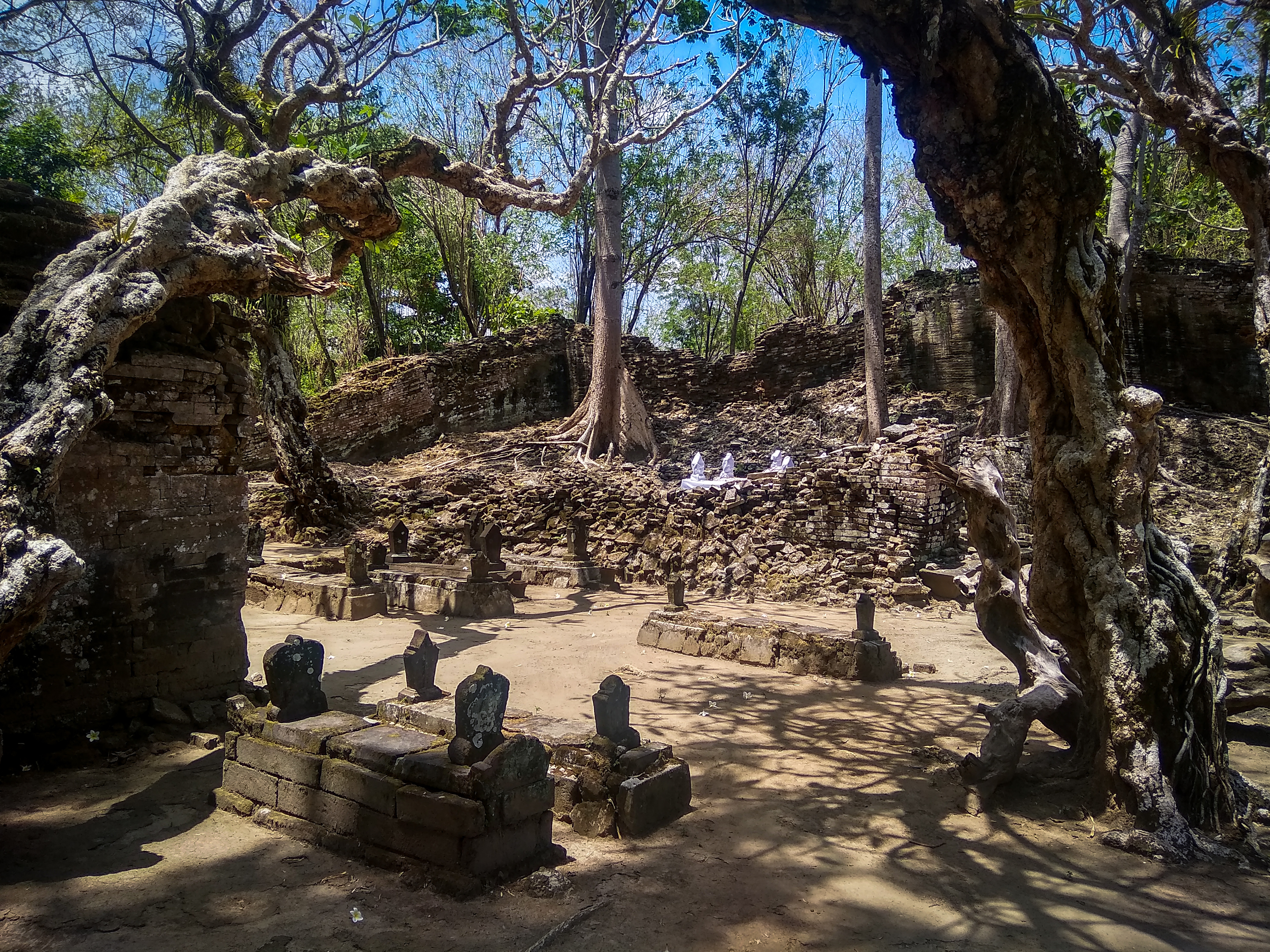
The Tomb of Ratu Mas Malang in 2021.

Based on data from the Archaeological Technical Study Report conducted by the Cultural Heritage Preservation Agency (BP3) Yogyakarta (now BPK Region X) from 27 September 2004 to 12 October 2004, the Ratu Mas Malang Tomb complex is administratively located at the peak of Mount Sentana, (Note: Mount Sentana is the name of the hill's peak, while Mount Kelir is the name of the hamlet (Robson 2003, pp. 71–72).) Gunung Kelir Hamlet, Pleret Village, Pleret District, Bantul Regency, Special Region of Yogyakarta Province, at an altitude of approximately + 99 meters above sea level. Priswanto and Alifah added that the physical condition of this tomb complex has generally suffered damage, primarily due to natural factors such as earthquakes on 10 June 1867 and 27 May 2006, as well as microorganisms (algae, moss, and lichens) that have deteriorated the tomb walls.

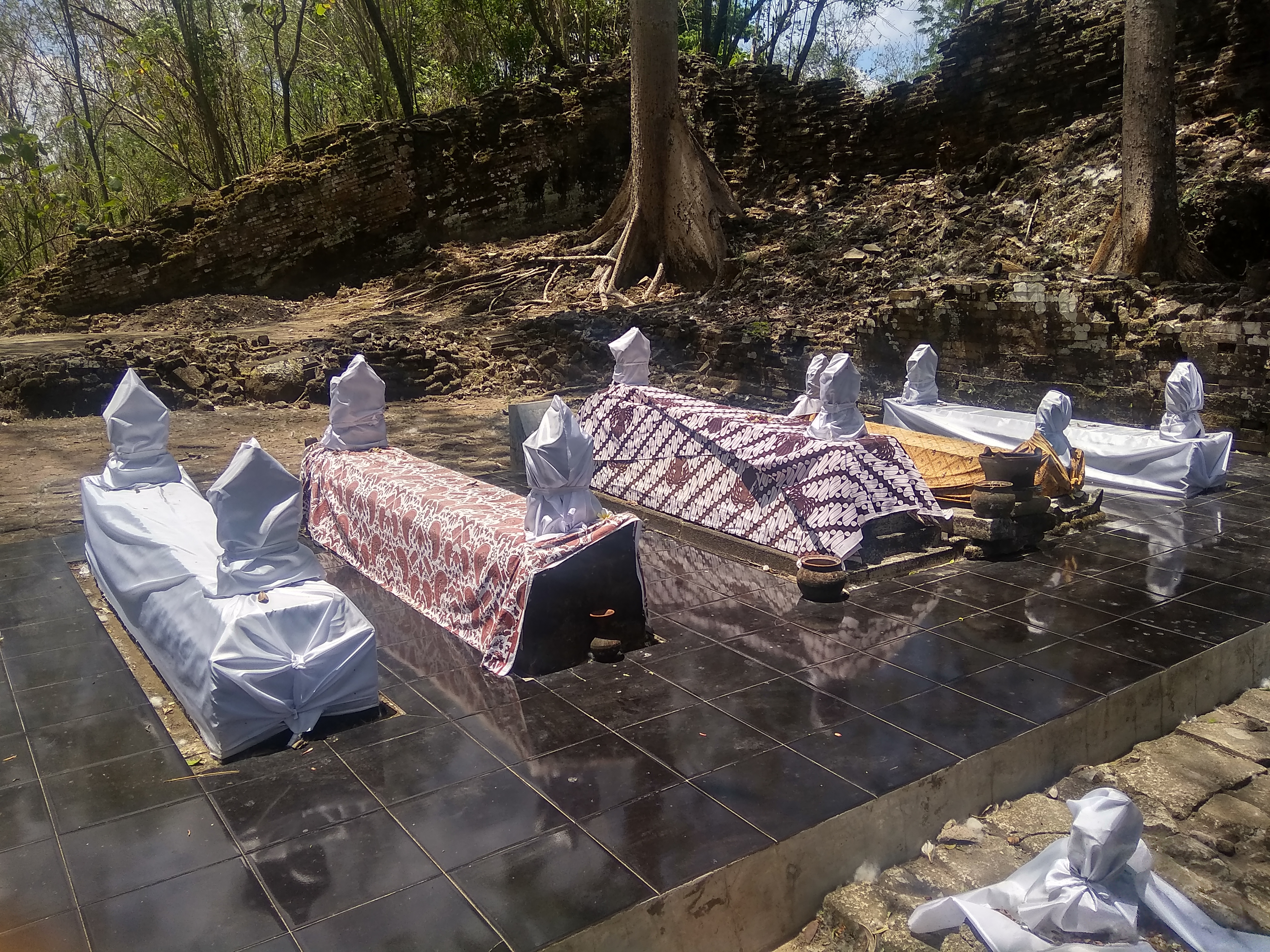
The gravestone of Ratu Mas Malang (center).

The Babad Momana records that this tomb was constructed over approximately three years, from the death of Mas Malang in 1665 to 11 June 1668. Amangkurat I named the site Antakapura (in Kawi), which means “palace of death” or “palace for burying the deceased”. Meanwhile, the local community referred to it as Makam Gunung Kelir (Mount Kelir Tomb) due to the grooves on the tomb walls resembling the kelir (screen) used in wayang kulit performances.

This cultural heritage site covers a total area of approximately + 32 meters x 33 meters. The tombs within the site number 28 in total and are divided into three sections: the front yard with 19 tombs, the main yard with eight tombs (including the tomb of Mas Malang), and the back yard with one tomb (the tomb of Dalang Panjang). Prasetyo, on the official website of BPCB Yogyakarta, stated that the tomb walls were constructed from blocks of white stone, while the majority of the gravestone were made of andesite stone. Among these, 14 gravestone are bracket-shaped, and one is trapezoidal. Furthermore, Prasetyo added that other tombs, consisting of stacked white stones, do not have gravestone.

Another site located within the same complex as this cemetery is Sendang Maya. This site, consisting of two ponds, is located to the northeast of the tomb and functions as a rainwater reservoir. The pond inside the surrounding wall measures approximately + 3,5 meters x 5 meters, while the one outside the surrounding wall measures about + 6 meters x 6 meters. The sendang is surrounded by a brick wall similar to that of the Tomb of Ratu Mas Malang, with a height of about + 3 meters and a thickness of 2,1 meters. Surakso Sardjito, the caretaker of the tomb, who was interviewed by Rohman, stated that the sendang was initially intended to be used by Amangkurat I to bury Mas Malang, but the ground kept releasing water when it was dug. Eventually, Amangkurat I buried the woman in the same cemetery complex as Dalang Panjang.

The National Cultural Heritage Registration System records the presence of an andesite stone slab found in this cemetery complex. Local residents believe that the stone, named Watu Jonggol and featuring two protrusions at both ends, is a puppet box belonging to Dalang Panjang. Sardjito reinforced this statement by adding that anyone whose hand span can reach the entire length of the stone will have their wish granted.

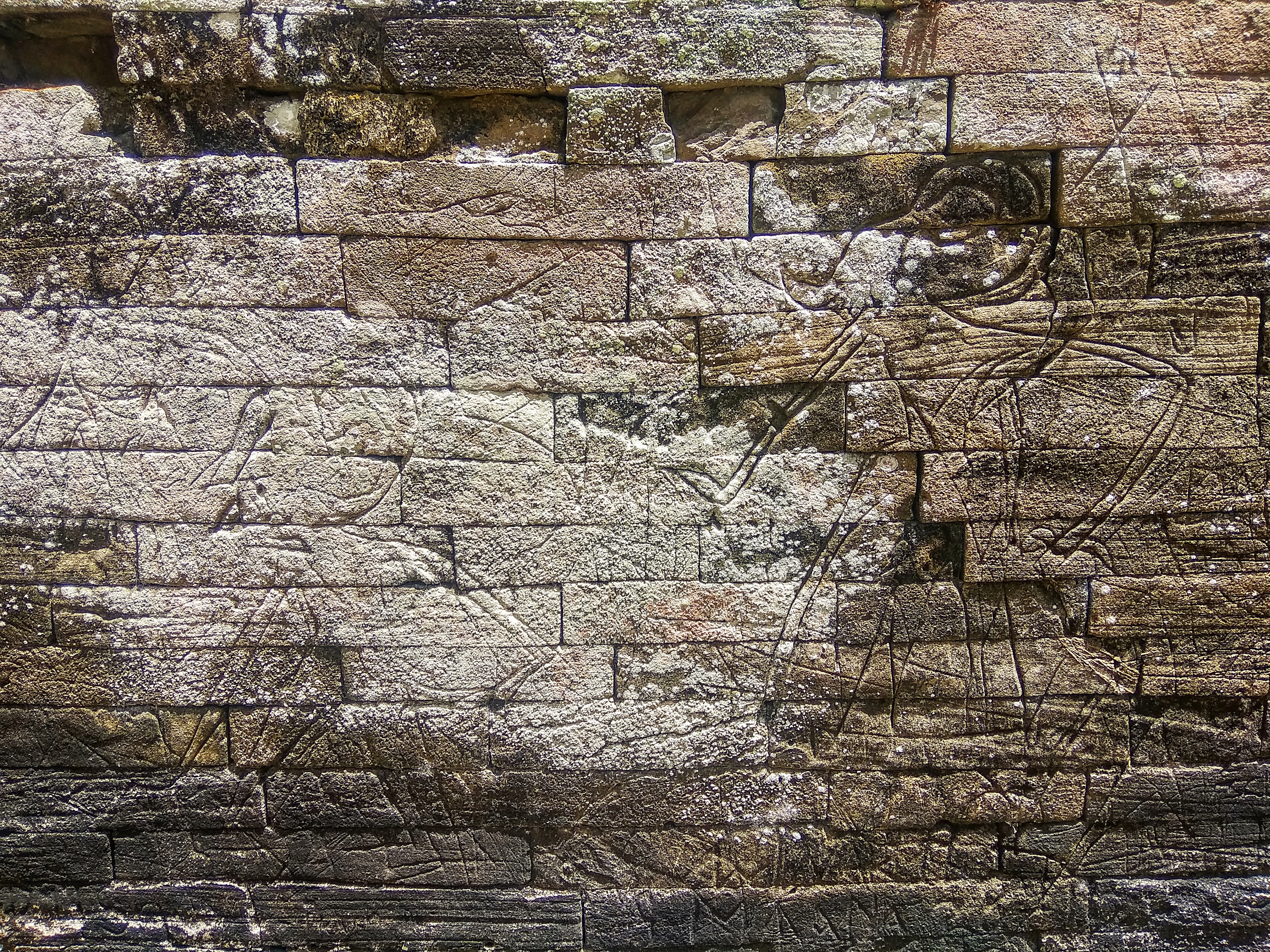
The puppet carvings on one of the tomb walls.

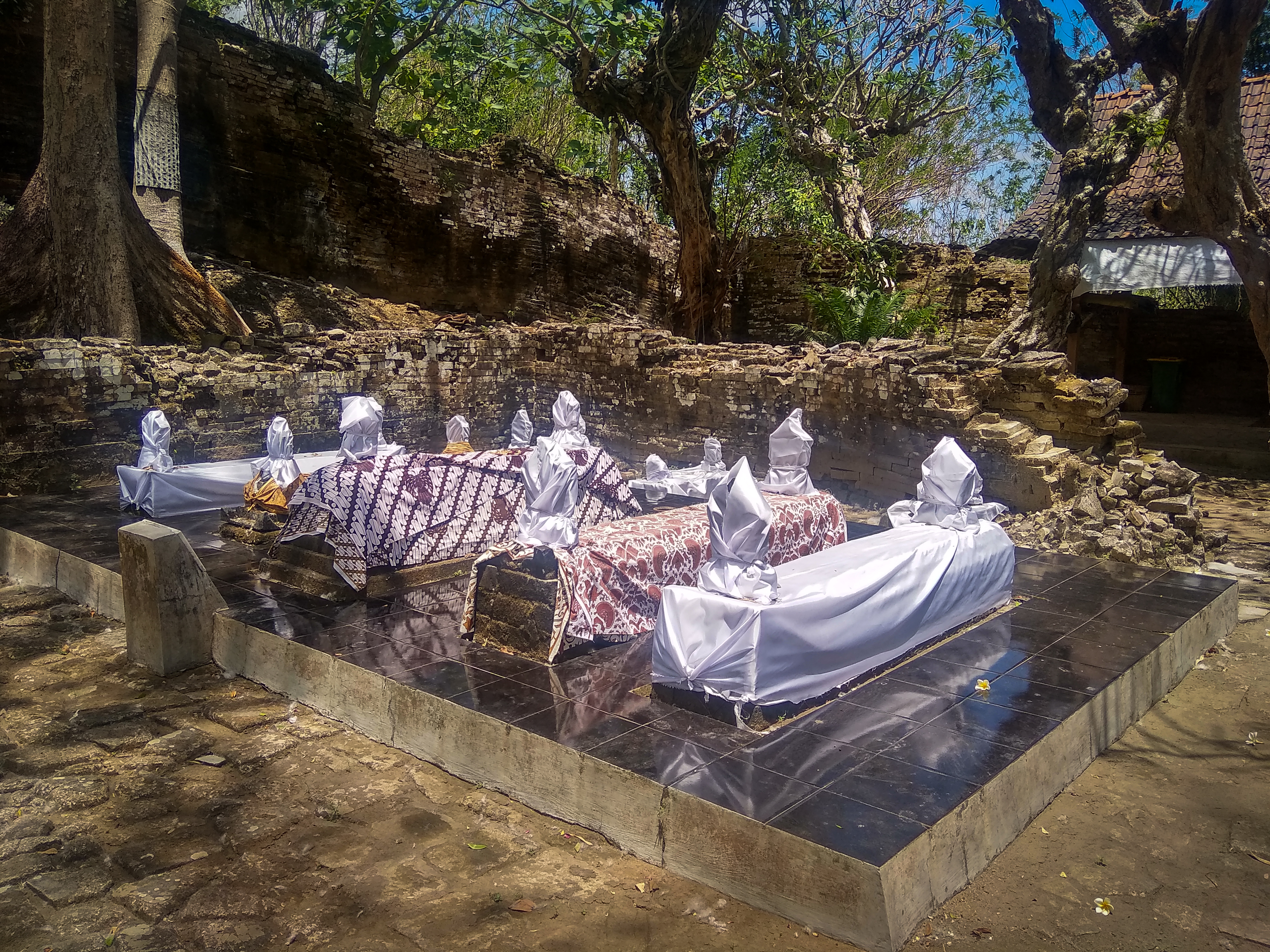
The tombstone in the core yard of the tomb.

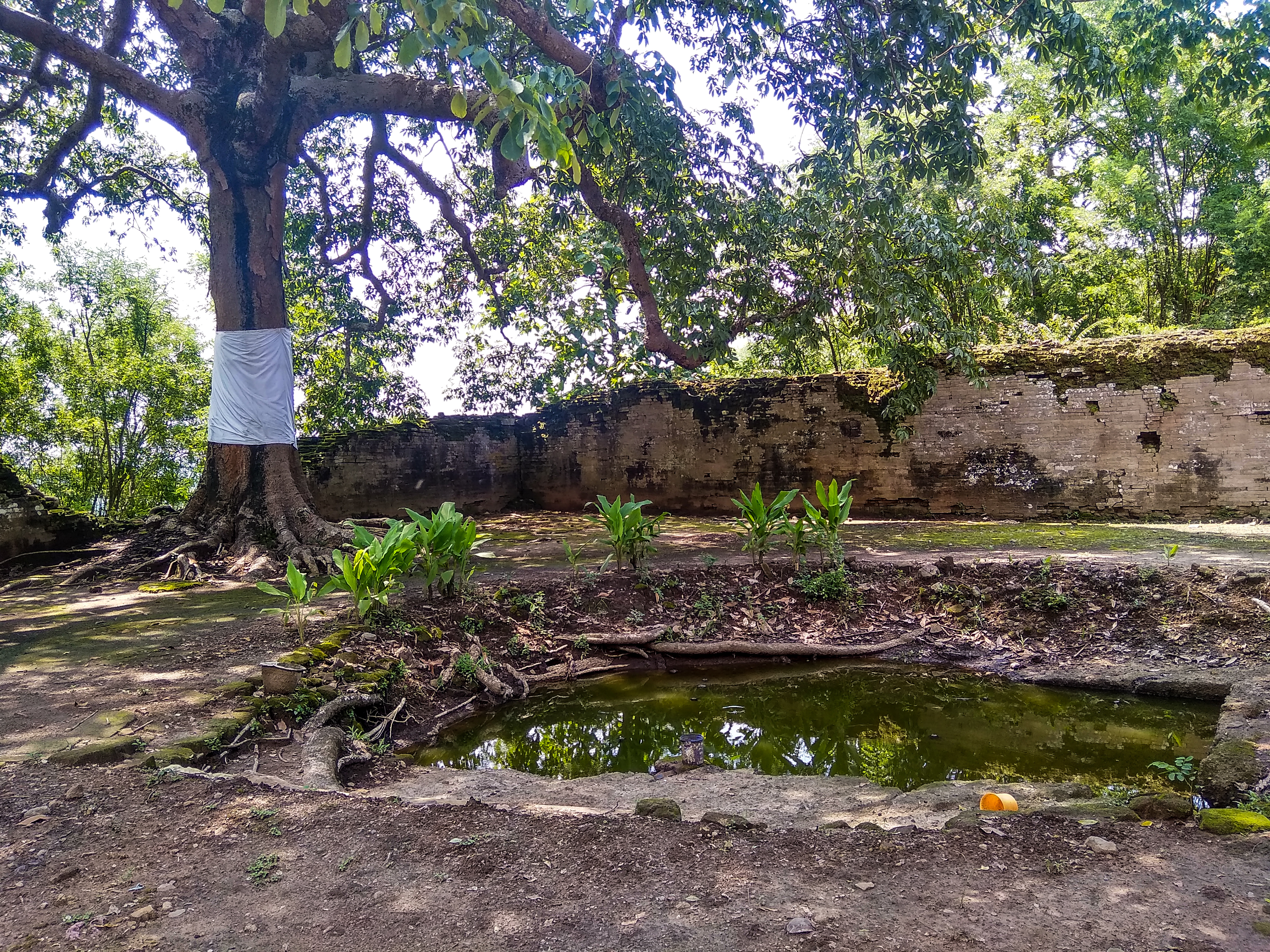
Sendang Maya.

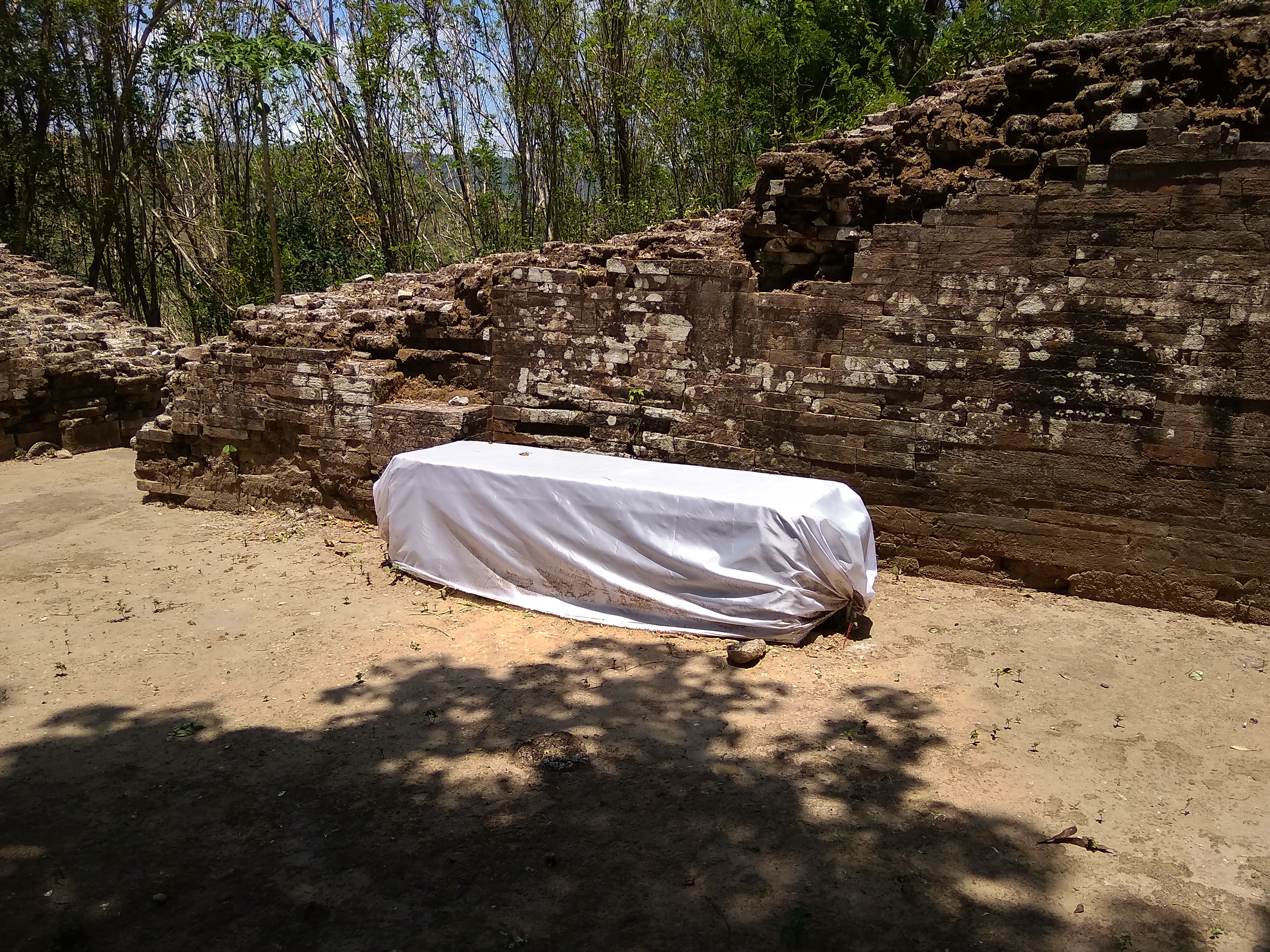
Watu Jonggol.

== The founding origins ==
According to Adrisijanti, this site is associated with Ki Dalem or Ki Panjang Mas and Ratu Mas Malang. Mas Malang was the daughter of a wayang gedog puppeteer named Ki Wayah, who later became a concubine of Amangkurat I. Several sources mention that Mas Malang's real name was Retno Gumilang or Nyai Truntum. Before becoming a concubine, she was the wife of Dalang Panjang, one of the puppeteers in the Sultanate of Mataram during the reign of Susuhunan Anyakrawati or Panembahan Seda ing Krapyak. Dalang Panjang’s real name was Sapanyana, and he originated from the Residency of Pati. Some oral traditions claim he was a disciple of Sunan Kalijaga, but this claim is unfounded. (Note: Ki Panjang Mas lived during the reigns of Panembahan Anyakrawati and Amangkurat I. Anyakrawati ruled from 1601 to 1613, while Amangkurat lived from 1619 to 1677 and began his reign in 1646. Sunan Kalijaga himself is estimated to have lived from 1430 to 1580. The strongest evidence supporting Kalijaga's birth around the 1430s is a record of his marriage to Sunan Ampel's daughter, Siti Khafsah, in the 1450s, when Kalijaga was 20 years old (Sabiq 2021, pp. 2–4). As for his death, the most credible account places it around the 1580s, citing records that he visited the Sultanate of Mataram during the leadership of Panembahan Senapati. His passing is also linked to the succession of the head of the Perdikan Kadilangu, which was taken over by his son (Farobi 2019, pp. 110). Based on these records, the claim that Dalang Panjang was a disciple of Kalijaga is not credible due to the significant difference in their lifetimes.)

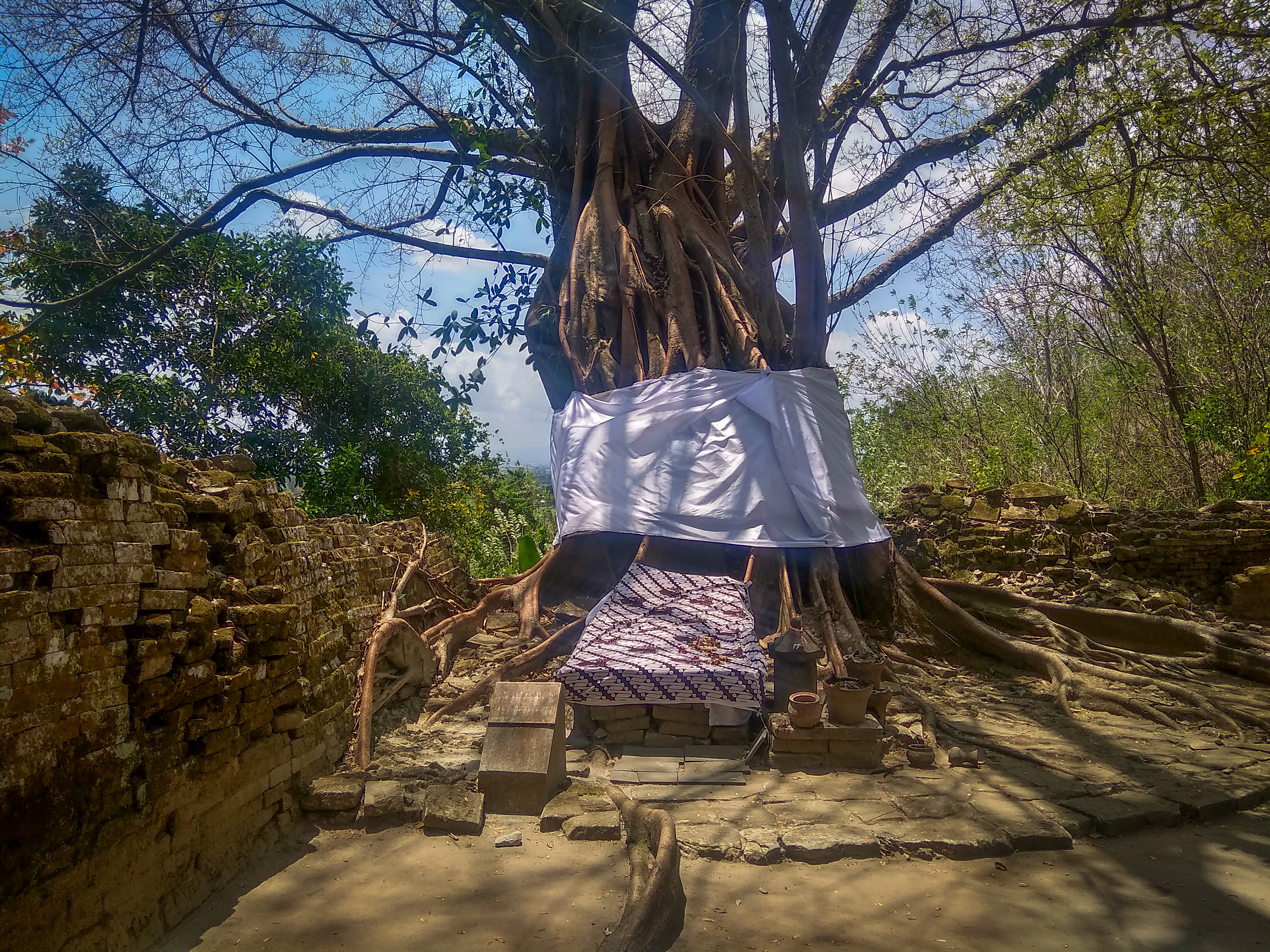
The gravestones of Ki Panjang Mas.

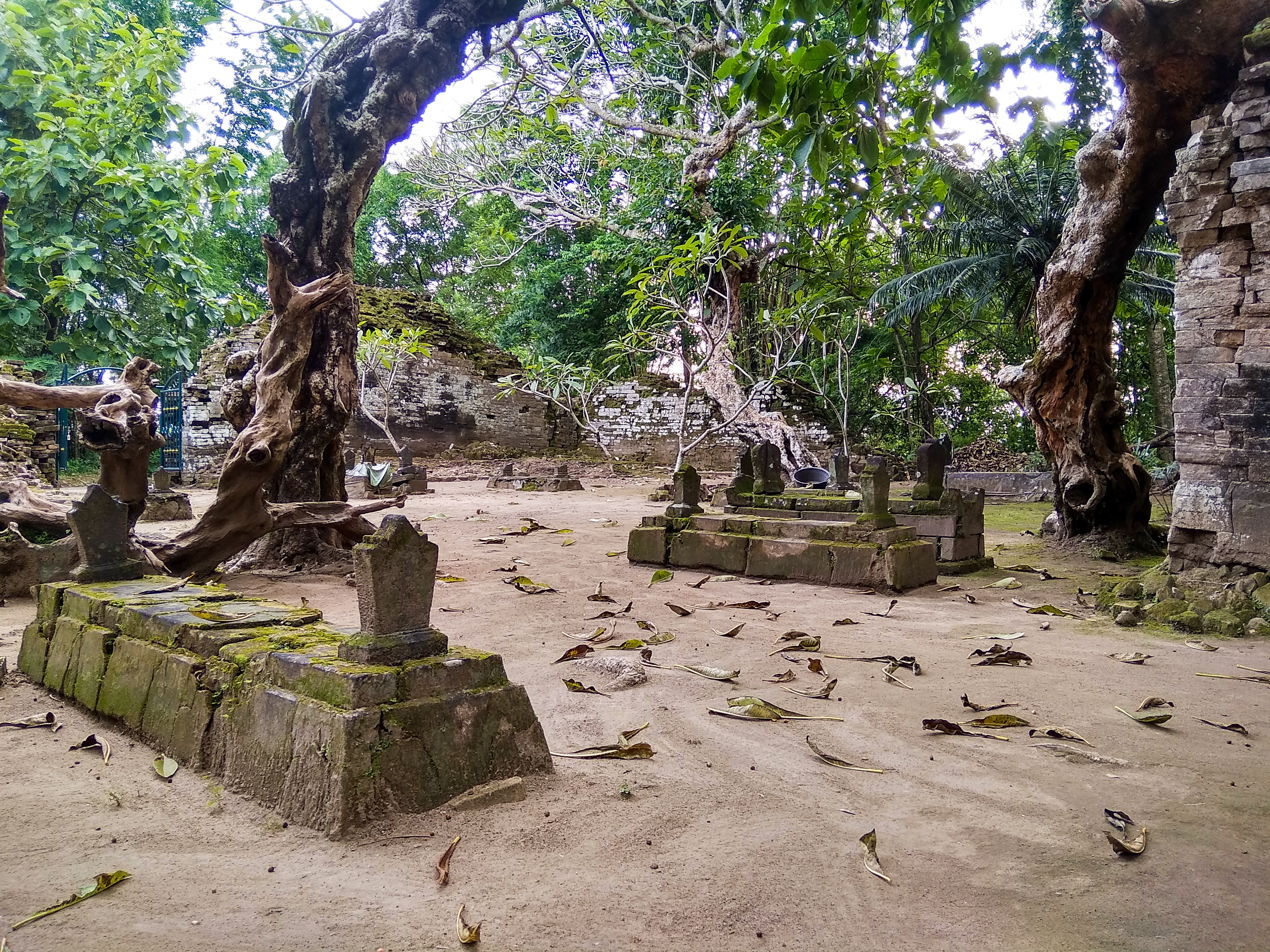
Several nameless gravestones in the front courtyard of the cemetery are believed to be the burial sites of musicians and singers who were killed alongside Ki Panjang Mas.

To this day, Dalang Panjang is regarded as a spiritual and academic figure among master puppeteers in Yogyakarta and Central Java. According to oral traditions passed down through generations, he earned the name Panjang Mas after performing a puppet show at the Southern Coast. The ruler of the Southern Coast gave him a long golden tray as a reward because he refused monetary compensation. This gift earned him the name Ki Panjang Mas.

Dalang Panjang was known for his extraordinary breath control and melodious voice, which allowed him to chant without interruption or strain. Additionally, he was a writer who created guidelines for ruwatan (purification rituals). He mandated that anyone wishing to conduct a ruwatan ceremony in Mataram must seek his permission. He also replaced wayang beber with wayang kulit in ruwatan ceremonies. As a puppeteer, Dalang Panjang had a pengrawit (troupe of musicians) and sinden (singers), one of whom was his wife—a woman considered nearly perfect in physical form based on katuranggan (a Javanese science of interpreting physical traits). This perfection caught the attention of Amangkurat I, who became infatuated with Mas Malang.

According to the Babad Tanah Jawi: Javanese Rijskroniek, Amangkurat I initially ordered his troops to find a new concubine. He eventually encountered Dalang Wayah, who had a daughter, Mas Malang. However, she was already married to Dalang Panjang and two months pregnant. Ignoring this, Amangkurat I ordered his troops to forcibly bring her to the palace. Johannes Jacobus Meinsma stated that Amangkurat I deeply loved her, elevating Mas Malang to his favorite concubine with the title Ratu Wetan. However, she was accused of disrupting the royal household. Hermanus Johannes de Graaf refuted this claim in his book The Fall of the Mataram Palace. He observed that Amangkurat I did not neglect his other concubines and queen consort but gave more attention to Mas Malang, earning her the title Ratu Malang, which means "one who obstructs the path".

Eventually, Mas Malang gave birth to a son fathered by Dalang Panjang around 1649, named Pangeran Natabrata or Raden Resika. Amangkurat I secretly ordered his troops to kill Dalang Panjang and bury him at the peak of Mount Sentana to avoid potential problems. However, Margana, in an interview with Sabandar, provided a different account of Dalang Panjang’s death. He stated that Amangkurat I invited Dalang Panjang, Mas Malang, and their troupe to perform at the palace. Dalang Panjang and his entire troupe were killed midway through the performance, except for Mas Malang, who ultimately agreed to become a concubine as she had no other choice.

The Babad Tanah Jawi further mentions that Amangkurat I forcibly took Mas Malang from Dalang Panjang, making it unsurprising that he killed the man loved by his concubine. However, the Daghregister 1677, a Dutch government record based on accounts from a palace guard, states that Dalang Panjang died naturally. After becoming a widow, Mas Malang was made a concubine by Amangkurat I. De Graaf and Ricklefs expressed doubts about this claim. They believed that Amangkurat I’s history of numerous sins made it plausible that he would murder Dalang Panjang. (Note: Amangkurat I was the fourth ruler of the Sultanate of Mataram, reigning from 1646 to 1677. He was born in 1618/1619 under the name Raden Mas Sayyidin. His father was Sultan Agung, and his mother was the daughter of the Duke of Batang, who held the title Ratu Wetan. Ricklefs, in his study titled War, Culture, and Economy in Java 1677–1726, described Amangkurat I as a ruthless ruler. His behavior was influenced by the numerous rebellions that marked his reign (Ricklefs 1993, pp. 68–70).) De Graaf argued that official palace reports were more reliable than oral stories, which should be set aside.

Mas Malang eventually discovered that her husband had been killed by palace soldiers. The woman frequently muttered in her sleep and became deeply sorrowful whenever she remembered him. Not long after, she died of dysentery, though some claimed she was poisoned by palace figures who disliked her. Amangkurat I, on the other hand, suspected that his beloved concubine had been bewitched, as her body emitted a pungent fluid before her death.

He also interpreted Mas Malang’s murmurs of "dalem, dalem, dalem..." as a reference to the courtiers and concubines jealous of her. While ordering his soldiers to construct a tomb for the woman he loved on Mount Sentana, he also commanded the execution of the courtiers and concubines he suspected. They were killed slowly—tied up, confined in a house, and left without food or water until they died of starvation and exhaustion. All the victims were buried on Mount Sentana.

De Graaf clarified that this action was understandable, given Amangkurat I’s suspicions regarding the strange symptoms exhibited by his concubine before her death. If poison was indeed the cause, the culprit would likely be among the victim’s closest circle, possibly the concubines who had once conspired with the rebellious crown prince (Pangeran Dipati) against him.

Furthermore, De Graaf added that suspicions arose among palace relatives that the king intended to transfer the crown prince’s status to Natabrata, despite his lack of Mataram lineage. These suspicions were strengthened by two attempts by the king himself to poison the crown prince. The attempted murders drew significant attention even beyond the kingdom. The entry of Mas Malang into the palace had sparked extraordinary political intrigue, leading the king to consider eliminating his own son for the sake of his beloved concubine and her child. Amangkurat I’s actions seemed incomprehensible and were noted in a Dutch government report dated 21 December 1663, stating that such "horrific crimes would surpass all previously committed atrocities".

According to oral traditions in the Pleret region, Margana recounted that Amangkurat I had not accepted Mas Malang’s death. He brought her body to Mount Sentana but did not bury it; instead, he laid it down and preserved it to prevent decay, even occasionally continuing to have intercourse with her corpse. De Graaf explained that Amangkurat I brought his son, Pangeran Natabrata, to accompany him and refused to return to the palace. François Valentijn, a Dutch minister, documented this in Oud en Nieuw Oost-Indien (The Old and New East Indies), describing Amangkurat I’s condition after Mas Malang’s death.

❝When the woman passed away, the Sunan was so deeply saddened that he neglected the affairs of the kingdom. After her burial, he secretly returned to the tomb without anyone knowing. His love for her was so profound that he could not restrain himself and lay down beside her in the grave❞.

After about two weeks at the tomb, Amangkurat I dreamed that Mas Malang had reunited with her husband. Upon waking, he realized his wrongdoing in separating Mas Malang from her spouse and came to terms with her death. He then ordered his soldiers to bury Mas Malang’s body at the site and returned to the palace. It is said that a spring, Sendang Maya, emerged as Mas Malang’s body was being prepared for burial at the location. The local community believes the spring’s water possesses miraculous properties. Mas Malang’s death dealt a severe blow to Amangkurat I. According to Dutch officials’ reports, he was unable to govern effectively for four to five years afterward and even failed to greet high-ranking Dutch envoys visiting Mataram. In the interim, his duties were carried out by the kingdom’s ministers.

== Literature ==
This site has been adapted into a short story in Indonesian literature by Indra Tranggono, titled Makam Para Pembangkang (The Graveyard of Rebels). The short story was first published in the Jawa Pos daily on 15 May 2005, and later included in a short story anthology titled Menebang Pohon Silsilah (Cutting Down the Family Tree) by Kompas Publishing in 2017. Below is an excerpt from the short story.

❝Temuilah aku di bukit itu, sebelum rindu cemasku membatu, sebelum aliran darahmu membeku. Bukankah angin telah menyebarkan kabar itu kepadamu, hingga kerinduanku pun luluh dalam detak nadimu. Lihatlah, di sana ada puluhan nisan yang terserak! Di pojok itu, di bawah nisan yang diapit dua pohon beringin, bersemayam Ki Dalang Panjang Mas. Jika engkau memutar pandanganmu sedikit ke kanan, engkau akan menjumpai lima nisan di atas tanah yang agak tinggi. Tepat di tengahnya, bersemayam Retno Gumilang, istri ki dalang. Dia juga biasa dipanggil Mas Malang, sedangkan di samping bawah nisan Mas Malang itu, terserak belasan nisan-nisan tanpa nama, nisan-nisan para penabuh gamelan, sinden, dan entah siapa lagi. Bagaimana mungkin dalang, istri dalang, sinden, para penabuh gamelan, dan sekotak wayang bisa binasa bersama? Apakah maut begitu kompak bekerja?❞

Translation:

❝Meet me on that hill, before my anxious longing turns to stone, before the flow of your blood freezes. Hasn't the wind carried the news to you, softening my yearning in the rhythm of your pulse? Look, there are dozens of scattered graves! Over there, beneath the gravestone flanked by two banyan trees, rests Ki Dalang Panjang Mas. If you shift your gaze slightly to the right, you'll find five graves on a slightly elevated ground. At the center lies Retno Gumilang, the dalang's wife, also known as Mas Malang. Below her gravestone are numerous unnamed graves—those of gamelan players, sindens, and others unknown. How could the dalang, his wife, the sindens, the gamelan players, and a box of puppets perish together? Could death truly work in such unison?❞

== Bibliography ==
Archive

- Dinas Pariwisata Kabupaten Bantul (2013). "Daftar Benda Cagar Budaya Kabupaten Bantul Tahun 2013" (PDF). Arsip Dinas Pariwisata Kabupaten Bantul. Archived from the original (PDF) on 28 July 2021.
- Kementerian Pendidikan dan Kebudayaan Direktorat Jenderal Kebudayaan Balai Pelestarian Cagar Budaya Daerah Istimewa Yogyakarta (2014–2019). "Daftar Inventaris Bangunan Cagar Budaya Tak Bergerak di Kabupaten Bantul". Arsip Balai Pelestarian Cagar Budaya Daerah Istimewa Yogyakarta. Archived from the original on 4 September 2019.
- Meinsma, Johannes Jacobus (1875). De opkomstvanhet Nederlandsch gezag in Oost-Indie: Verzameling van Onuitgegeven Stukken uit het Oud-Koloniaal Archief. Register op deel I-VII/bew door (Vol. 1).

Book

- Adrisijanti, Inajati (2000). Arkeologi Perkotaan Mataram Islam. Yogyakarta: Penerbit Jendela. ISBN 978-979-9597-84-7.
- de Graaf, Hermanus Johannes (1987). Runtuhnya Istana Mataram. Jakarta Pusat: Grafitipers. ISBN 978-979-4440-36-0.
- Farobi, Zulham (2019). Sejarah Wali Songo (Perjalanan Penyebaran Islam di Nusantara). Yogyakarta: Anak Hebat Indonesia. ISBN 978-623-2449-22-0.
- Mardiono, Peri (2020). Tuah Bumi Mataram: Dari Panembahan Senopati Hingga Amangkurat II. Bantul: Araska Publisher. ISBN 978-623-7537-79-3.
- Olthof, W.L.; Sumarsono, H.R. (2009). Babad Tanah Jawi: Mulai dari Nabi Adam Sampai Tahun 1647. Yogyakarta: Narasi. ISBN 978-979-1680-47-9.
- Priswanto, Hery; Alifah (2019). Pleret: Dinamika Ibu Kota Mataram Islam Pasca Kotagede (PDF). Yogyakarta: Balai Arkeologi Daerah Istimewa Yogyakarta. ISBN 978-623-9148-80-5.
- Ricklefs, Merle Calvin (1993). War, Culture, and Economy in Java 1677–1726: Asian and European Imperialism in the Early Kartasura Period. Sydney: Allen and Unwin. ISBN 978-186-3733-80-9.
- Robson, Stuart (2003). The Kraton: Selected Essays on Javanese Courts. Leiden: Koninklijk Instituut voor Taal-, Land- en Volkenkunde (KITLV). ISBN 978-900-4487-93-2.
- Sabiq, Fairuz (2021). Sunan Kalijaga dan Mitos Masjid Agung Demak. Indramayu: Adab. ISBN 978-623-6233-81-8.
- Sujarweni, V. Wiranata (2017). Menelusuri Jejak Mataram Islam di Yogyakarta. Yogyakarta: Anak Hebat Indonesia. ISBN 978-623-2447-35-6.
- Tranggono, Indra (2017). Menebang Pohon Silsilah. Jakarta: Kompas Media Nusantara. ISBN 978-602-4121-94-5.

Old book

- Badan Pengendalian Dampak Lingkungan Hidup Daerah Provinsi Daerah Istimewa Yogyakarta (2007). Inventarisasi Kearifan Lokal Tahun 2007. Yogyakarta: Badan Pengendalian Dampak Lingkungan Hidup Daerah Provinsi Daerah Istimewa Yogyakarta.
- Setiadi, Amos; Fransisca, Yunike (2018). Profil Wisata Kecamatan Pleret, Kabupaten Bantul (PDF). Bantul: Program Kemitraan Masyarakat (PKM) Penataan Kawasan Wisata Puncak Sosok.

Journal

- Pratama, Henki Riko; Priswanto, Hery (November 2013). "Sebuah Informasi Mutakhir Hasil Penelitian Tahun 2013 di Situs Kedaton Pleret, Kabupaten Bantul, D.I. Yogyakarta". Berkala Arkeologi. 33 (2): 239–252. doi:10.30883/jba.v33i2.31. ISSN 0216-1419.
- Sekarnina, Dwita (November 2018). "Melacak Jejak Kemegahan Ibu Kota Mataram Islam" (PDF). Mayangkara. 7 (1): 34–37. ISSN 2502-1567.
- Siswanta (June 2019). "Sejarah Perkembangan Mataram Islam Keraton Pleret". Karmawibangga. 1 (1): 33–42. ISSN 2715-4483.

Bulletin

- Rohman, Fandy Aprianto (2021). "Manajemen Bencana dalam Konteks Pelestarian Makam Ratu Mas Malang Oleh Balai Pelestarian Cagar Budaya (BPCB) D.I. Yogyakarta" (PDF). Buletin Kora-Kora (8 ed.).

Other

- Baga, Magdalena (2019). Potret Perempuan pada Sebuah Masa (Tiga Tokoh Perempuan Y.B. Mangunwijaya: Roro Mendut, Genduk Duku, dan Lusi Lindri). Gorontalo: Ideas Publishing. ISBN 978-623-2340-13-8.
- Haryono, Wahyu (2014). Amangkurat Agung (Prahara Takhta Mataram). Jakarta: Bhuana Sastra. ISBN 978-602-2495-83-3.
- Kresna, Ardian (2012). Amangkurat (Mendung Memekat di Langit Mataram). Bantul: Diva Press. ISBN 978-602-2550-06-8.
- Mas'ad (2020). Potret Cagar Budaya di Indonesia (PDF). Tangerang: Pusat Data dan Teknologi Informasi Kementerian Pendidikan dan Kebudayaan. ISBN 978-602-8449-56-4.
