= Light Rail Transit (Singapore) =

Automated guideway transit systems in Singapore

Light Rail Transit (LRT)

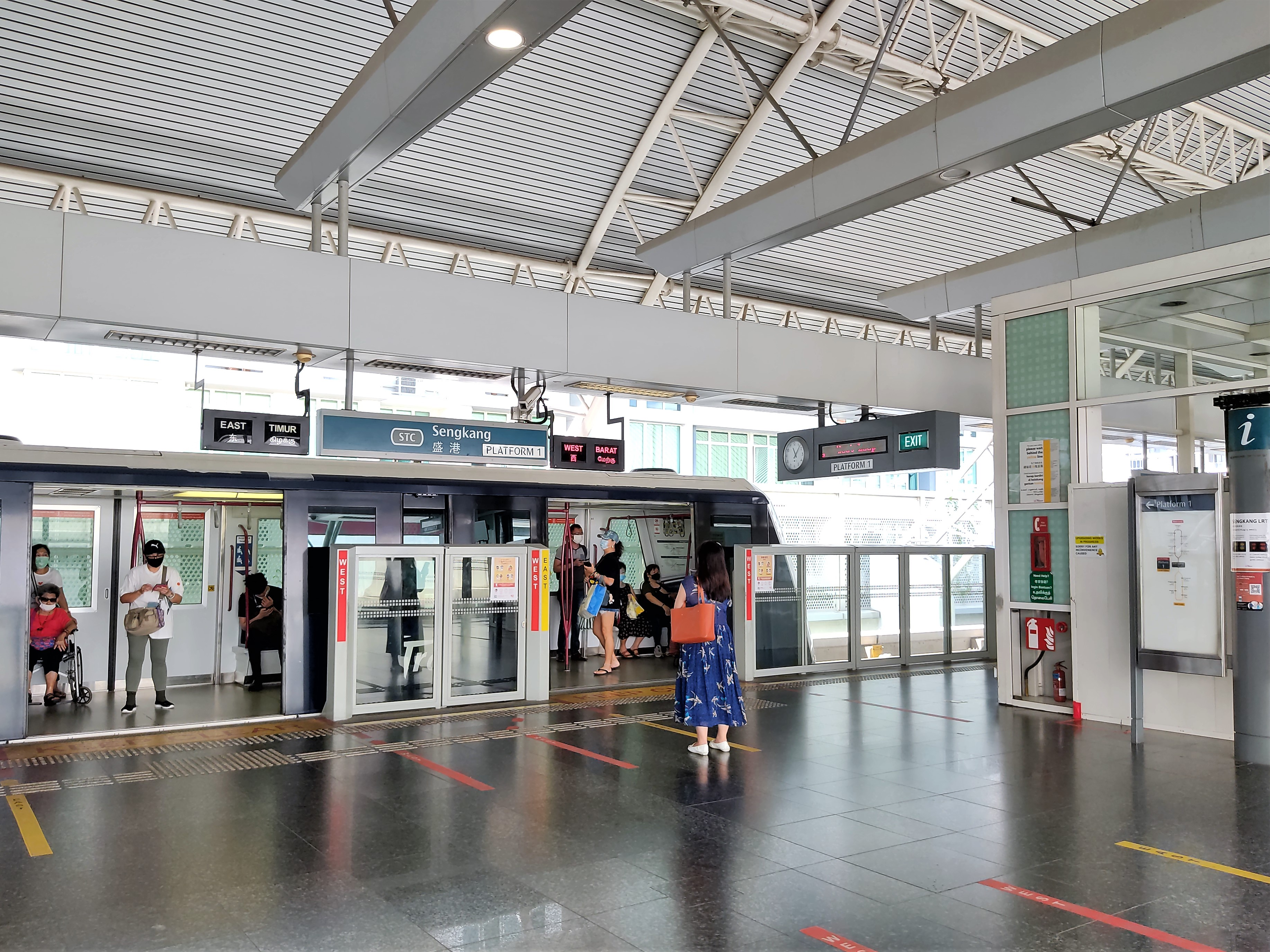
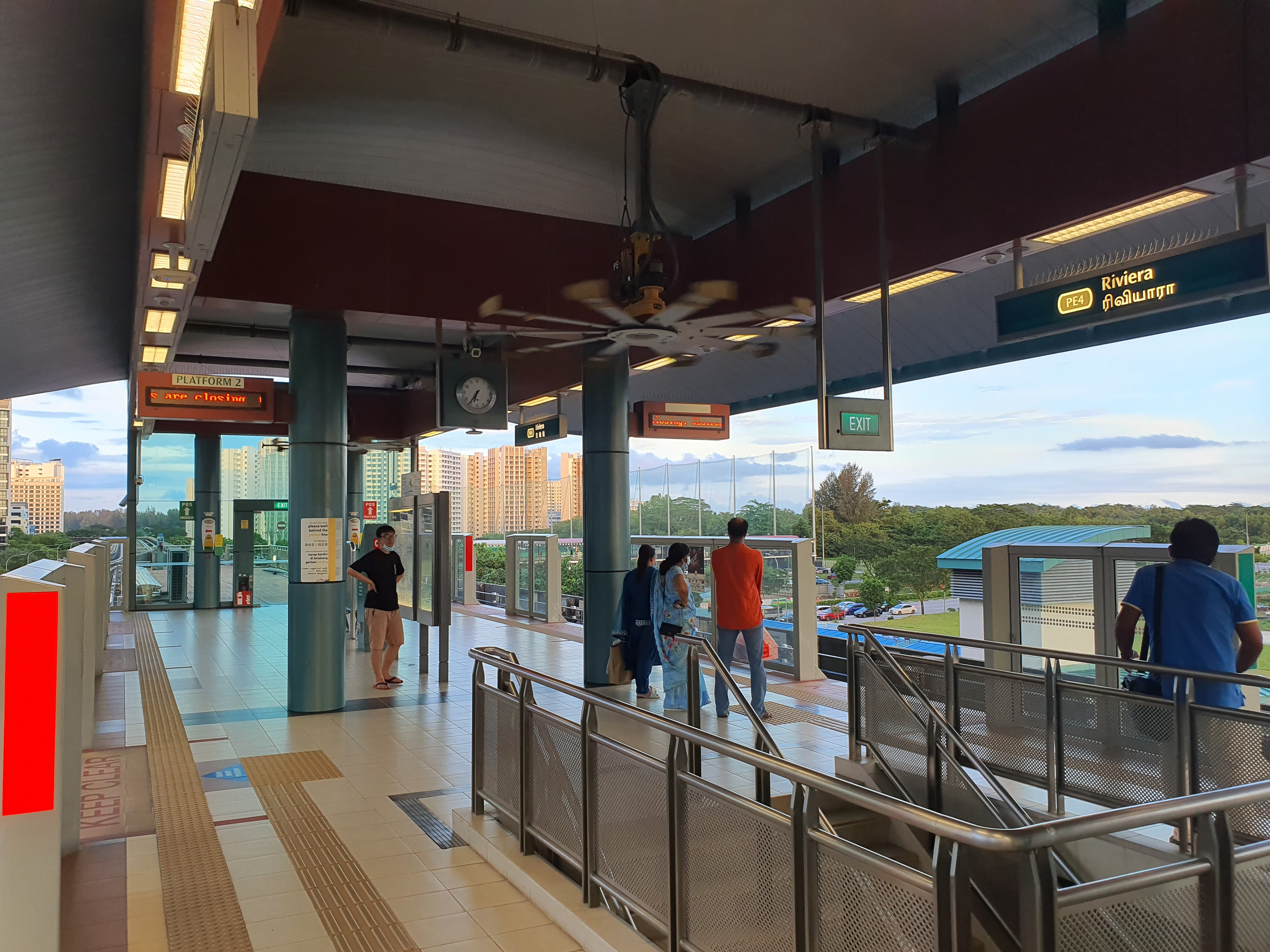
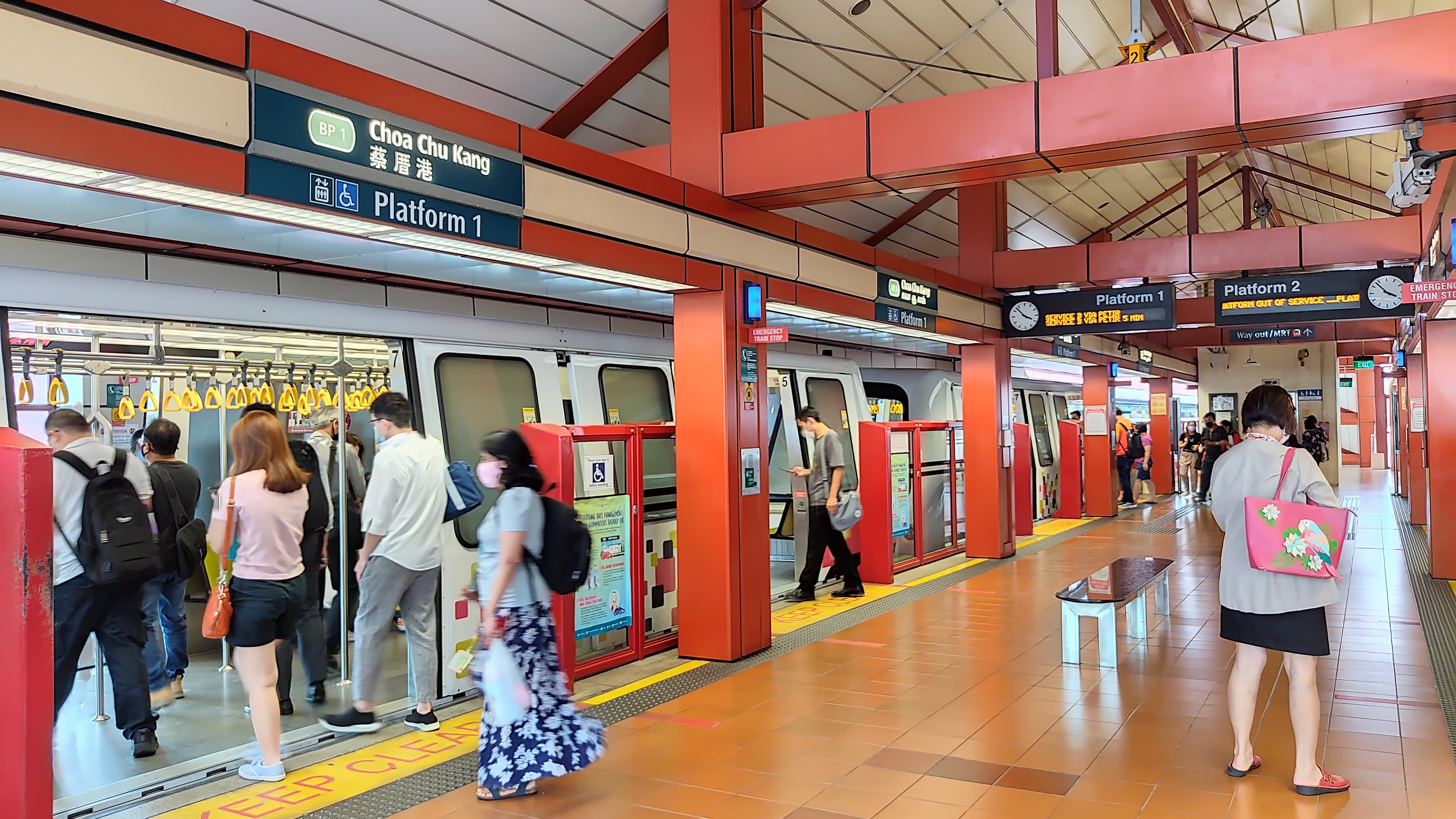
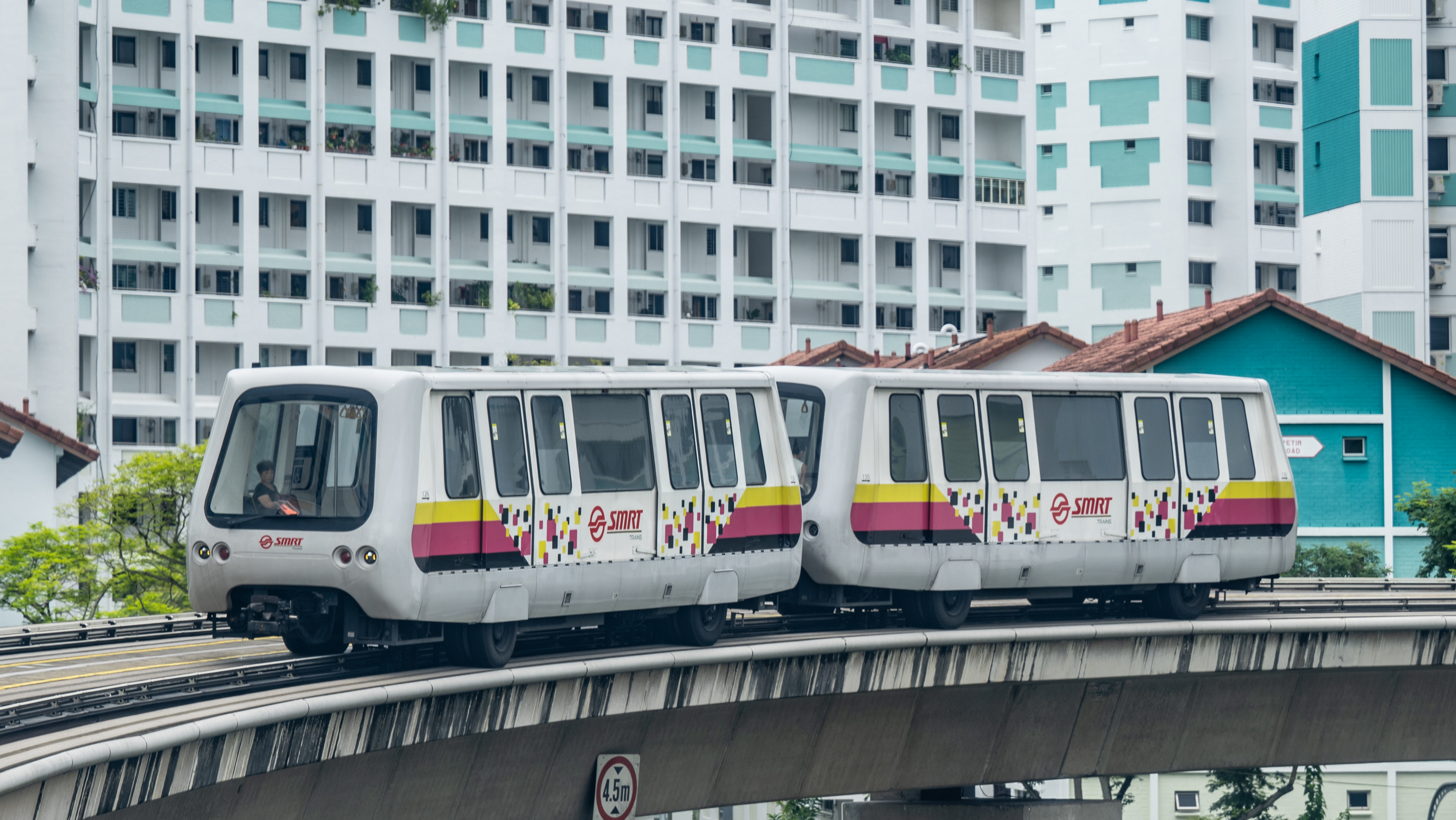
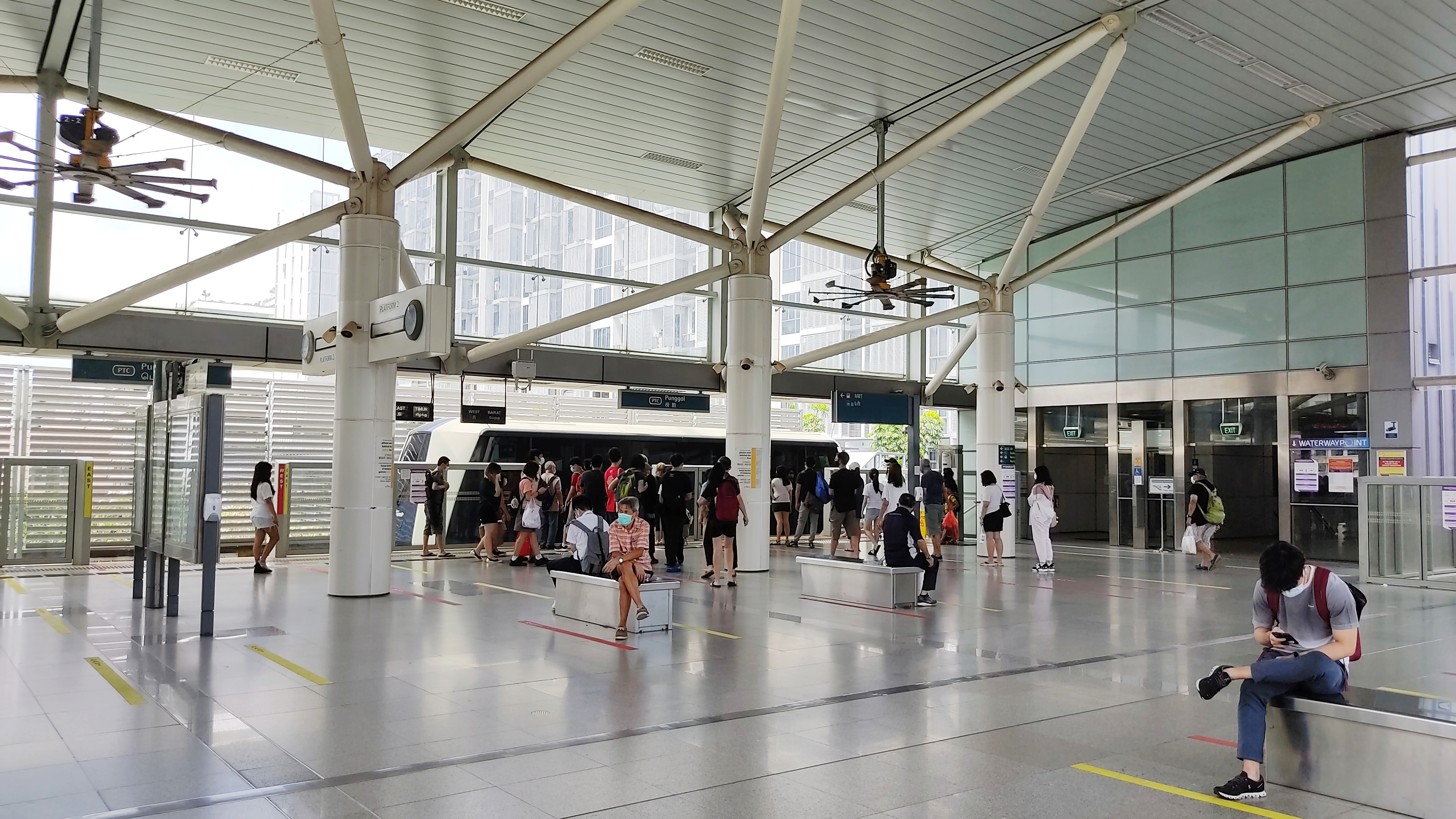
- From top, left to right: Platforms of Sengkang, Riviera and Choa Chu Kang LRT stations; a C801A train approaching Pending LRT station; Platforms of Punggol LRT station

Overview
- Native name: Sistem Rel Ringan (Malay) 轻轨列车系统 (Chinese) இலகு கடவு ரயில் (Tamil)
- Owner: Land Transport Authority
- Locale: Singapore
- Transit type: Automated guideway transit / People mover
- Number of lines: 3
- Number of stations: 42
- Daily ridership: 210,000 (2024)

Operation
- Began operation: 6 November 1999; 27 years ago
- Operators: SBS Transit (ComfortDelGro); SMRT Trains (SMRT Corporation)
- Number of vehicles: ~89 trainsets

Technical
- System length: 28.8 kilometres (17.90 mi)
- Track gauge: Bukit Panjang: 2,642 mm (8 ft 8 in); Sengkang & Punggol: 1,850 mm (6 ft 27/32 in) (guide rail span: 3.2 m (10 ft 6 in))
- Electrification: Third rail (Bukit Panjang: 600 volts 3-phase AC at 50 Hz, Sengkang & Punggol: 750 volts DC)
- Top speed: 50–80 km/h (31–50 mph)
LRT network map

The Light Rail Transit system, locally known by the initialism LRT, is a group of three people mover systems in Singapore which act as feeder services to the heavy rail Mass Rapid Transit (MRT) and together form the core of the country's rail transport services.

The first LRT line was opened in 1999 and the system has since expanded to three segments, serving the new towns of Bukit Panjang, Sengkang and Punggol, with a total system length of 28.8 kilometres (18 mi).. Trains on these lines have at least one station interchange link to the MRT.

Despite its name, the system is not light rail in the traditional sense of tram-style vehicles with partially grade-separated alignments. Instead, it uses people mover technology with rubber-tyred automated vehicles, based on technology developed for airports; the LRT and the Changi Airport Skytrain are technologically very similar.

Along with the MRT, the LRT is constructed and owned by the Land Transport Authority (LTA), with operating concessions currently handed to SMRT Trains Ltd, a subsidiary of SMRT Corporation, and SBS Transit, a subsidiary of ComfortDelGro. With the completion of Singapore's two LRT lines, there are currently no plans for further LRT networks.

== History ==
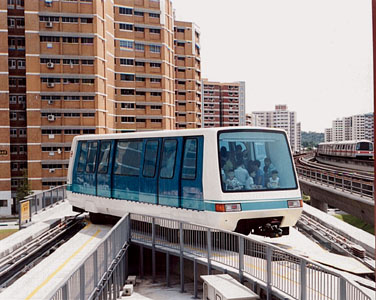
A C801 train approaching Choa Chu Kang LRT station in 1999

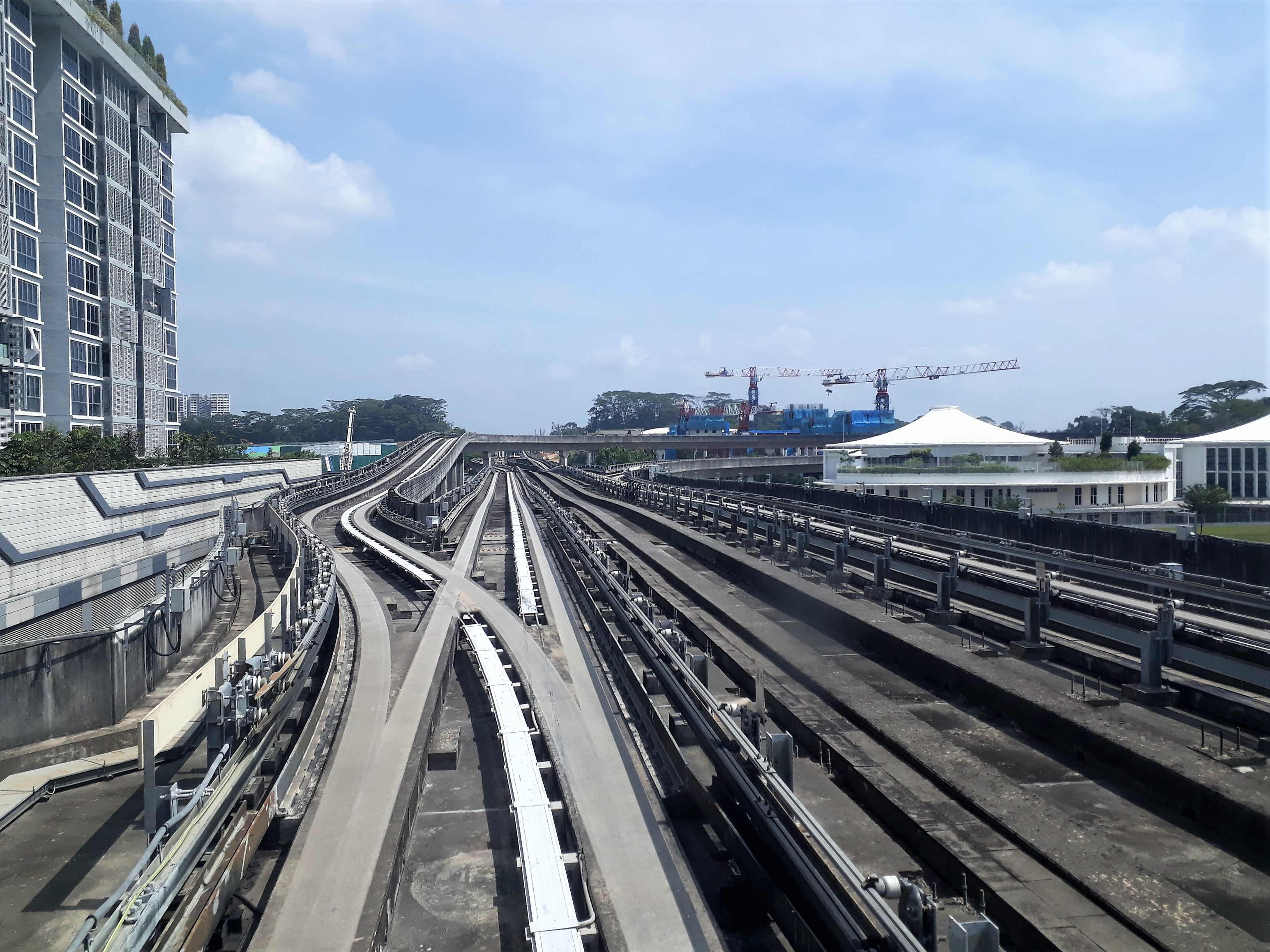
Track junction on the Punggol LRT line

=== Conception ===
In September 1991, the Urban Redevelopment Authority (URA) unveiled the revised Concept Plan 1991, which proposed a new mode of feeder rail that could serve new towns such as Yishun and Tampines. Such systems were to be fully automated and elevated light rail systems to serve as faster alternatives to existing feeder buses.

In 1994, then Communications Minister Mah Bow Tan tasked the Mass Rapid Transit Corporation (MRTC) to study the use of an LRT in Singapore, particularly as an internal feeder service for new towns. In particular, two towns, Bukit Panjang and Sengkang, were to be studied for the feasibility of the LRT. MRTC also commissioned British consultant, Oscar Faber TPA, to conduct a feasibility study for an LRT system in the Beach Road/Nicoll Highway corridor in anticipation of the increased demand for transport services in the area due to several major developments such as Suntec City, Marina Centre and Shenton Way. On 3 December that year, Mah announced the government's intentions to pilot two LRT systems at Bukit Panjang and Buona Vista. New LRT systems were also suggested for more mature towns such as Toa Payoh although further decisions were only to be made after the pilot programmes were conducted. Eventually, the proposed LRT around Buona Vista was cancelled due to insufficient demand for the rail line.

In 1995, study trips were made to the SK and Véhicule Automatique Léger (VAL) systems in France to study on the feasibility of building LRT systems near HDB public flats and integration of the LRT with other public transport modes as well as the H-Bahn suspended monorail system in Germany to study into the possibility of implementing such a system for Singapore Polytechnic and the National University of Singapore.

In 1996, the Land Transport Authority (LTA), which was formed from the merger of several transport statutory boards including MRTC in 1995, published a White Paper which outlined its goals for a world-class transport system in Singapore, one of which was the utilisation of LRT systems as feeder services to the MRT network, and the integration of LRT facilities with HDB estates to maximise convenience for residents.

In addition to using the LRT system as feeder service, the government also studied into the feasibility of using it to connect neighbouring towns with one another, such as Bedok-Tampines, Ang Mo Kio-Bishan-Toa Payoh, and the Jurong areas.

==== Punggol LRT line North Branch ====
A North Branch consisting of two to four LRT stations for the Punggol LRT line had been planned, which would have brought commuters from Punggol LRT station via Sam Kee and Teck Lee LRT station before branching out from the West Loop tracks onto this branch, terminating near Coney Island. The line code for the north branch would have been known as 'PN'. The branch was eventually never built and was only visible in the planning stages of Punggol LRT since 2000. It was eventually replaced by more bus services and the Punggol Coast extension of the North East Line which includes Punggol Coast MRT station on the North East Line (NEL) to better serve commuters in the area. It is also the new terminus of the North East Line, replacing Punggol MRT/LRT station as the terminus.

==== Jurong Region LRT line ====
A light rail network was proposed in 2001 which would have served the western regions of Singapore such as Jurong. It was also envisioned to serve commuters travelling to Nanyang Technological University (NTU). However, the LTA announced in 2008 that there were no plans for the line to be built. The project was later revived with the release of the Land Transport Master Plan 2013, in the form of the Jurong Region MRT line. It is set to open in stages from 2028 to 2029.

=== Opening of lines ===
The Bukit Panjang LRT line opened on 6 November 1999, with all 14 stations opening at the same time. Ten Mile Junction LRT station was closed from 10 December 2010 till 30 December 2011 for retrofitting works due to the closure and redevelopment of Ten Mile Junction shopping mall (now known as Junction 10), making it the first MRT/LRT station to be completely closed in Singapore after opening. The station was closed permanently from 13 January 2019 due to low demand. The closure of the station also led to the cessation of Bukit Panjang LRT Service C, formerly running from this station and looping in Bukit Panjang town via Senja. The vacated station was converted to Ten Mile Junction Depot Extension. This was also the first ever MRT and LRT station in Singapore's history to be permanently closed and removed from operations. It is the first and only LRT line to be operated by SMRT Light Rail.

The Sengkang LRT line opened in two main stages, the East Loop opening first on 18 January 2003 and most of the West Loop on 29 January 2005. Farmway LRT station on the West Loop subsequently opened on 15 November 2007. On 1 January 2013, Cheng Lim LRT station opened for passenger service and the west loop now operated in both directions. The last station on the line to be opened, Kupang LRT station opened for passenger service on 27 June 2015.

For the Punggol LRT line, the East Loop started operating on the same day as the Sengkang LRT's West Loop, with two stations closed. Oasis LRT station was opened for service on 15 June 2007, after more residents moved into HDB flats in the station's vicinity. Damai LRT station opened on 20 June 2011. The West Loop opened on 29 June 2014 at 11.15 am, with Nibong, Sumang and Soo Teck being the first stations to open. Sam Kee, Punggol Point and Samudera opened on 29 February 2016, 29 December 2016 and 31 March 2017 respectively. The last station on the line to be opened, Teck Lee LRT station opened for passenger service on 15 August 2024.

Currently, there are no plans to expand the LRT network beyond the existing three lines. Compared to buses, which are relatively more cost-effective and adaptable to adjust, LRT systems are difficult to rectify and can have long-term consequences. Furthermore, the LTA has been focusing on expanding the MRT network with additional medium-capacity lines, such as the Circle Line and Downtown Line, which serve the feeder role more effectively than LRT.

== Improvements ==
=== Bukit Panjang LRT ===
SMRT and LTA announced plans to completely overhaul the BPLRT system as the system was reaching its lifespan of 20 years. Transport Minister Khaw Boon Wan had also announced plans to shut the Bukit Panjang LRT down for a few years to facilitate for the system's overhaul.

On 23 October 2017, SMRT announced that from 12 November 2017 till the end of the year, the BPLRT will begin operations later at 7am instead of 5.30am on all Sundays, to allow more time for track maintenance and renewal works, which will oversee the replacement of ageing rail mounting frames and rail expansion joints.

On 23 March 2018, SMRT announced that the BPLRT will be closed on all Sundays from 15 April to 24 June 2018 to facilitate maintenance works, which will oversee the replacement of the power rail and track switch components.

On 21 June 2018, SMRT announced that from 1 July to 28 October 2018, the BPLRT will begin operations later at 8am instead of 5.30am on all Sundays, to carry out intensified maintenance work.

On 12 January 2019, Ten Mile Junction served its last passengers and closed on the next day, 13 January 2019. Service C, which served the station, was also withdrawn.

=== Sengkang–Punggol LRT ===
On 31 October 2012, LTA announced that by 2016, Sengkang and Punggol LRT systems will be upgraded to a two-car system for 16 of the 41 existing train cars, allowing double the number of passengers to board at any one time. Each train car can take up to 105 passengers. Hence, there is also the need to modify the signalling and communication system.

On 22 December 2015, the two-car trains entered service on the Sengkang LRT line, boosting capacity to 204 per trip as compared to 105 in a single car configuration.

Two-car trains entered service on the Punggol LRT line at the end of 2016.

On 15 December 2017, the Land Transport Authority announced that there will be limited services on parts of the Sengkang-Punggol LRT (SPLRT) on most Sundays from 14 January 2018 to 25 February 2018, to facilitate renewal and improvement works from (except 18 February as it was a Chinese New Year holiday). Only one platform will open for service at 5.30am on Sundays. The other platform will open from 7am. The arrangement continued until 29 April 2018.

On 14 February 2018, the LTA announced that it has taken over SBS Transit's rail assets (the North East MRT line and Sengkang-Punggol LRT lines) worth $30.8 million and transit to the New Rail Financing Framework on 1 April 2018. The LTA has also said that this will benefit commuters as there will be "more coordinated and timely expansion, and renewal of the rail system".

From 27 May 2018 to 7 October 2018, limited services on Sundays will continue on the Sengkang-Punggol LRT (SPLRT). One platform will open at 5.30am and the other platform will open at 5.30pm.

On 5 February 2021, the Land Transport Authority announced that it has purchased 17 two-car trains for the Sengkang and Punggol LRT systems. The new trains will be delivered progressively from 2024 to 2027. In addition to new trains, the Sengkang Depot will also be expanded to 11.1 ha from the existing 3.5 ha to ensure that is capacity and maintenance space for the new trains. The expansion of the depot will also see two new reception tracks being built to shorten the train launching time. To ensure there is enough electricity to support the larger fleet of trains, 3 new power stations will be built, increasing the total number of power stations supporting the system to 8 once completed.

From 19 April to 18 October 2026, the Sengkang LRT West Loop will only operate in the direction via Renjong from Sengkang station. This is to facilitate viaduct connection works to the new extension of the Sengkang LRT Depot between Layar and Tongkang stations.

== Infrastructure ==
=== Network ===
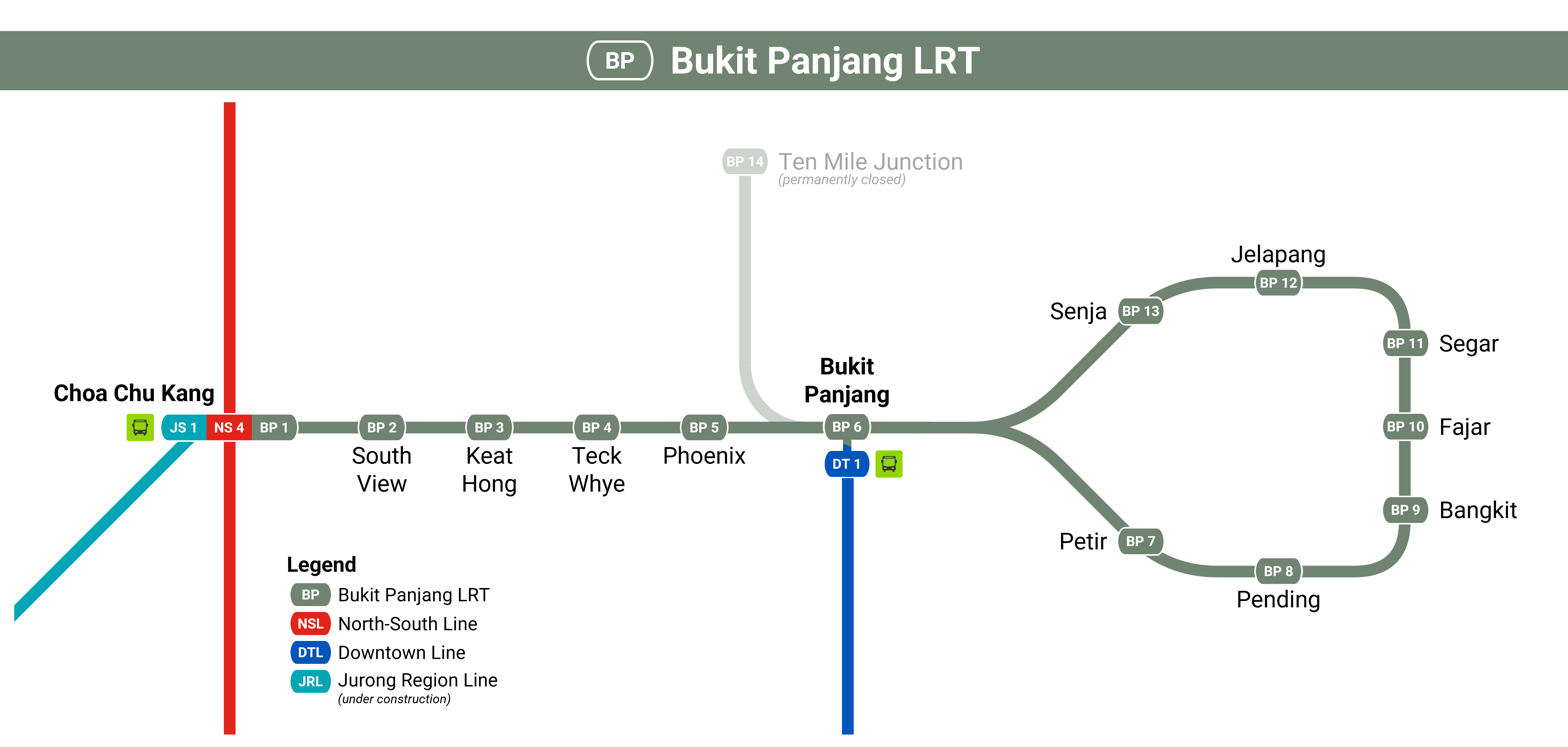
Map of the Bukit Panjang LRT line (BPLRT) (Note: Note that the current map displays the BPLRT route differently. For illustrative purposes, this illustration is based on the old map, which features Ten Mile Junction.)

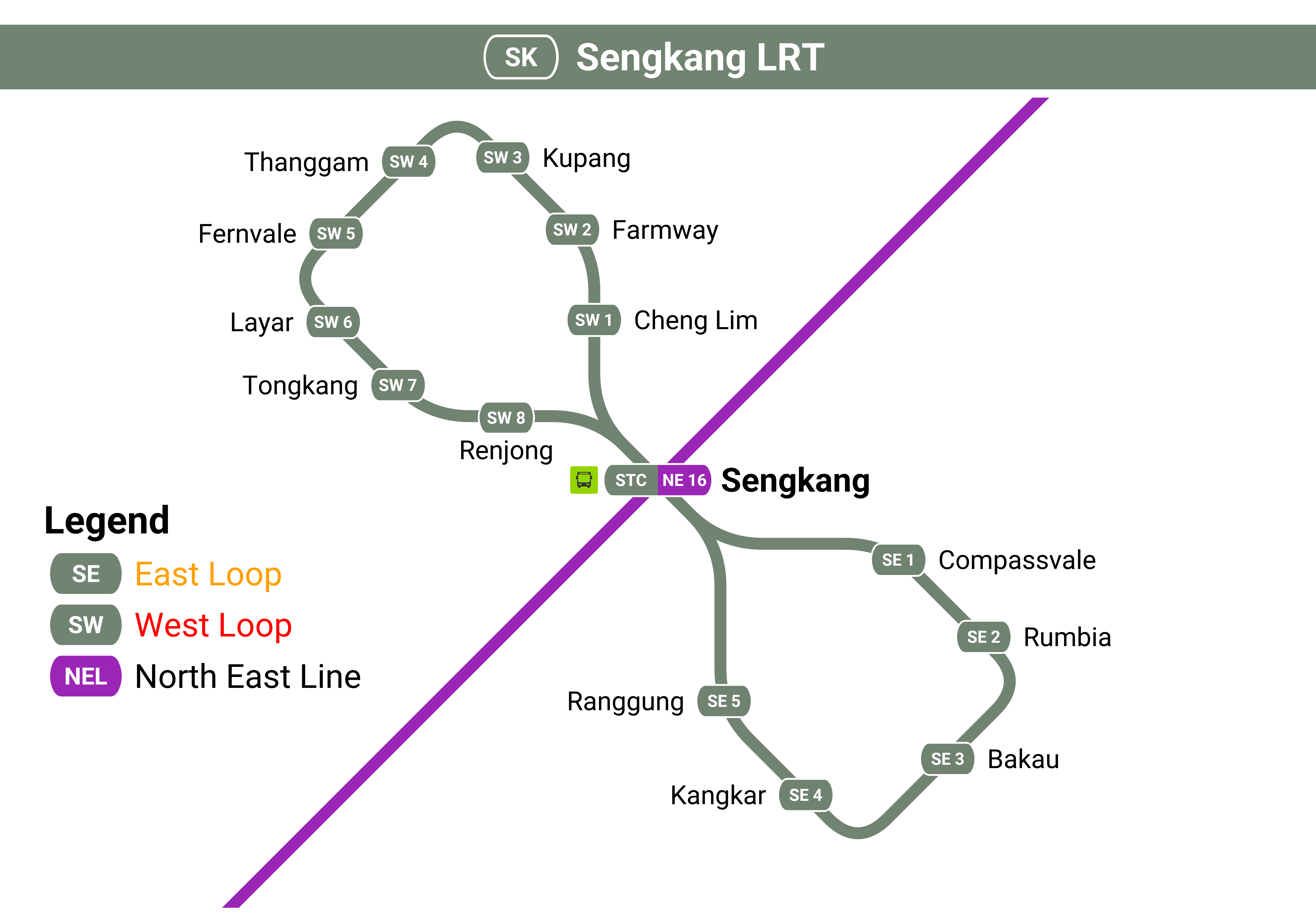
Map of the Sengkang LRT line (SKLRT)

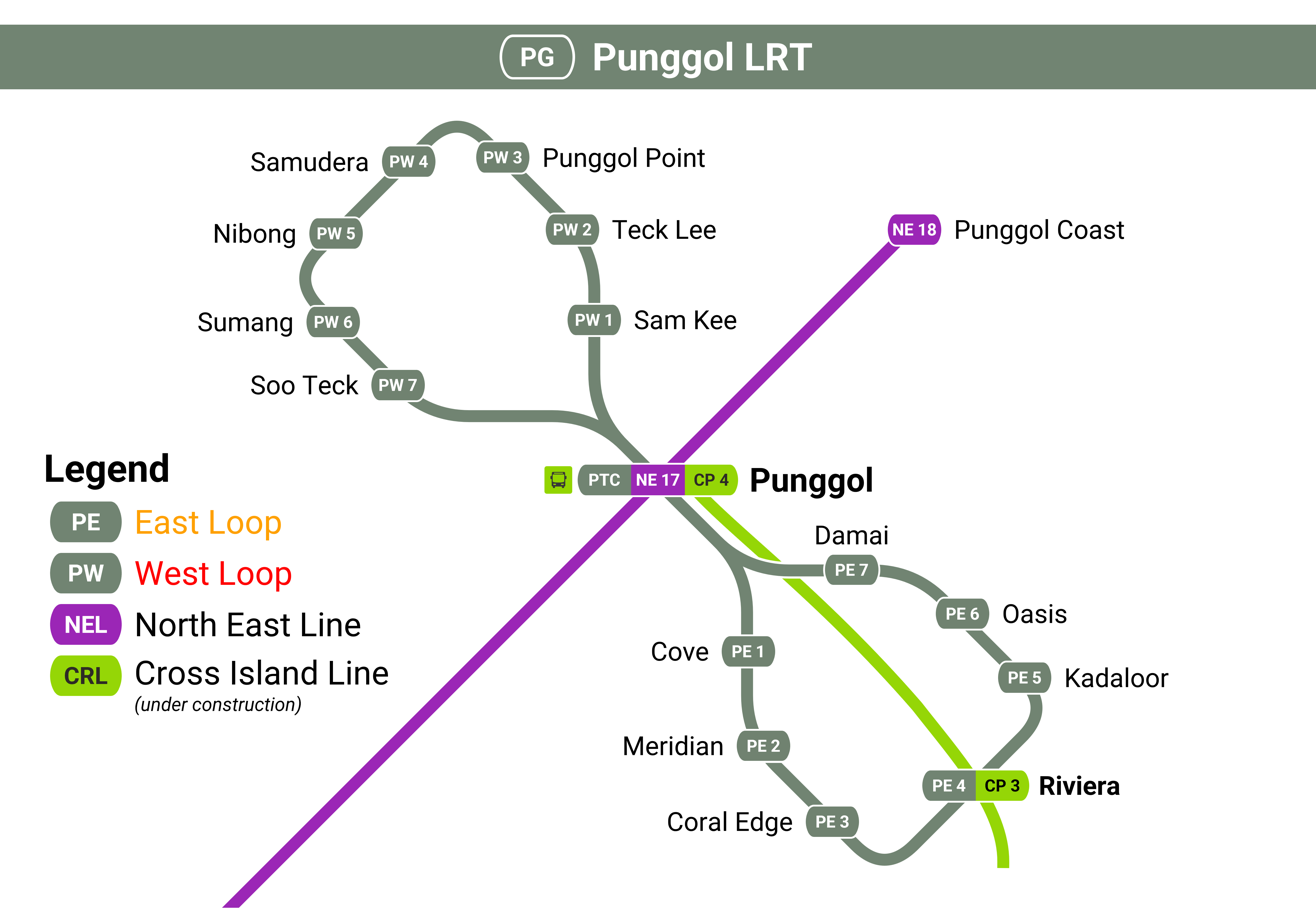
Map of the Punggol LRT line (PGLRT)

| Name and Colour | Commencement | Previous extension | Next extension | Terminus | Length | Stations | Depot | Electrification | Operator |
|---|---|---|---|---|---|---|---|---|---|
| Bukit Panjang LRT | 6 November 1999 | —N/a | —N/a | Choa Chu Kang | 7.6 km (4.7 mi) | 13 | Ten Mile Junction | Third rail, 600 V 50 Hz AC | SMRT Trains |
| Sengkang LRT | 18 January 2003 | —N/a | —N/a | Sengkang (East Loop) | 10.7 km (6.6 mi) | 5 | Sengkang | Third rail, 750 V DC | SBS Transit |
| Sengkang LRT | 29 January 2005 | 27 June 2015 (Note: Kupang LRT station) | —N/a | Sengkang (West Loop) | 10.7 km (6.6 mi) | 8 | Sengkang | Third rail, 750 V DC | SBS Transit |
| Punggol LRT | 29 January 2005 | 20 June 2011 (Note: Damai LRT station) | —N/a | Punggol (East Loop) | 10.3 km (6.4 mi) | 7 | Sengkang | Third rail, 750 V DC | SBS Transit |
| Punggol LRT | 29 June 2014 | 15 August 2024 (Note: Teck Lee LRT station) | —N/a | Punggol (West Loop) | 10.3 km (6.4 mi) | 7 | Sengkang | Third rail, 750 V DC | SBS Transit |
| Total: | | | | | 28.6 km (17.8 mi) | 42 | | | |

=== Facilities ===
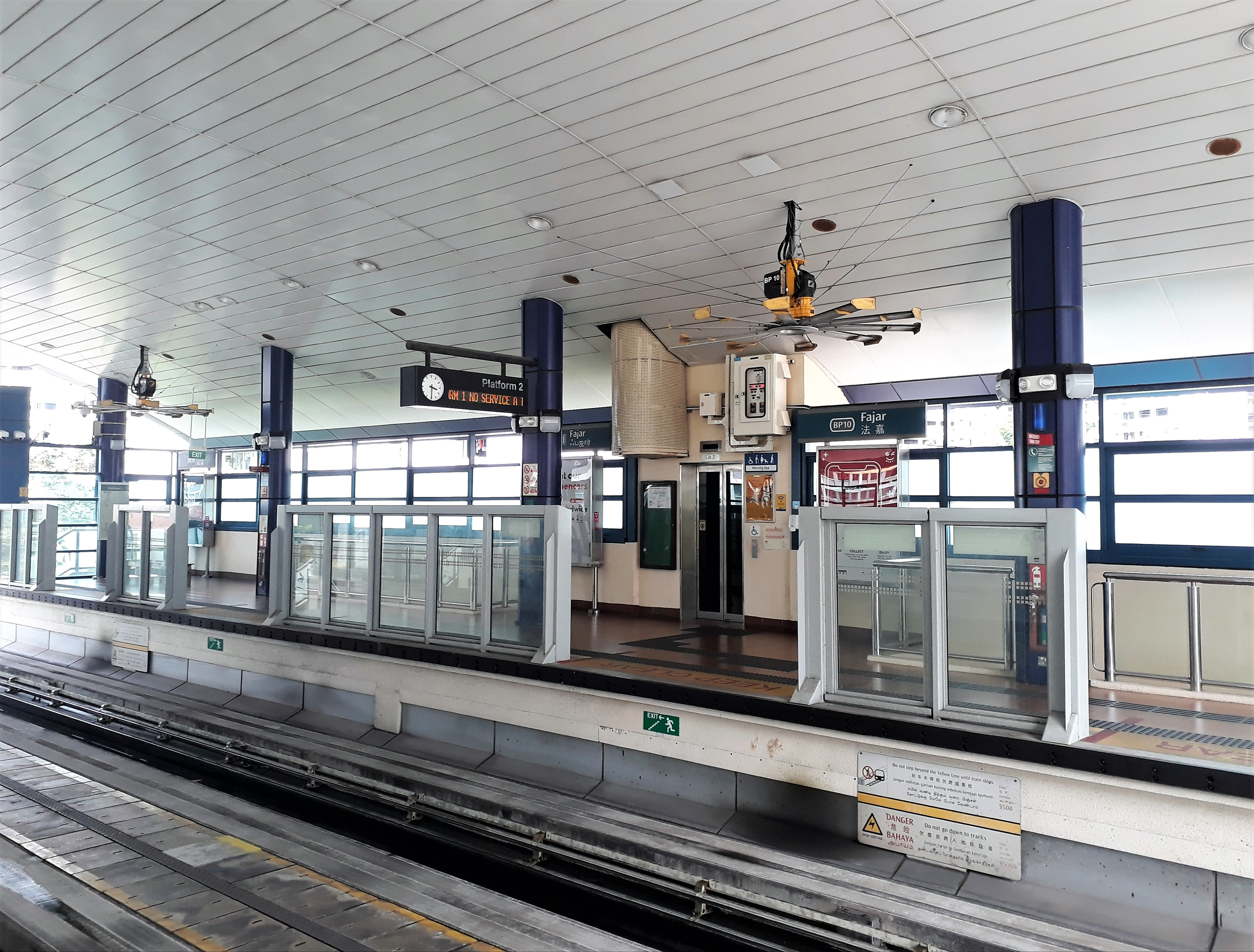
A lift at Fajar LRT station; lifts are available on all LRT stations.

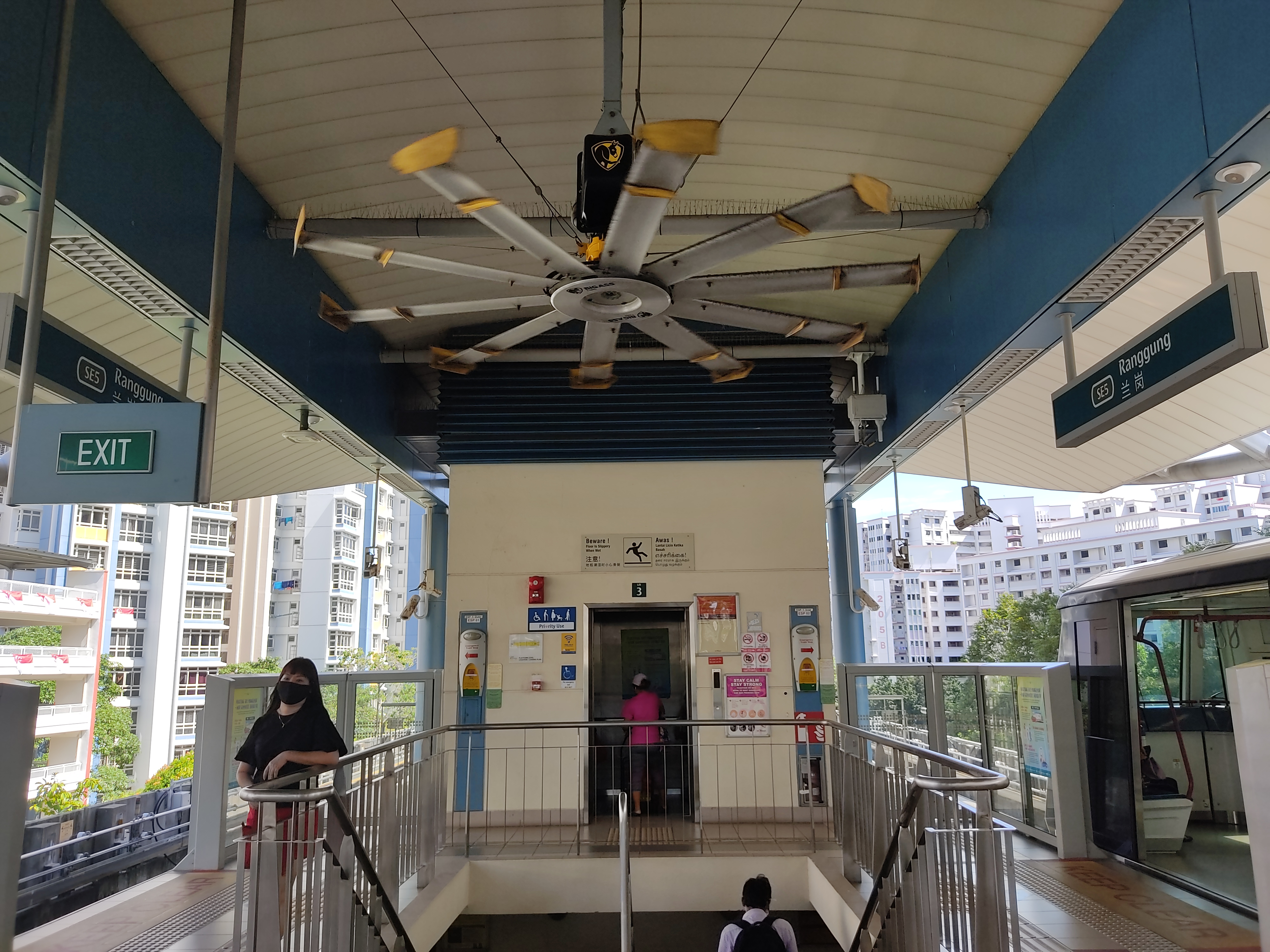
A high-volume low-speed fan at the ceiling of Ranggung LRT station.

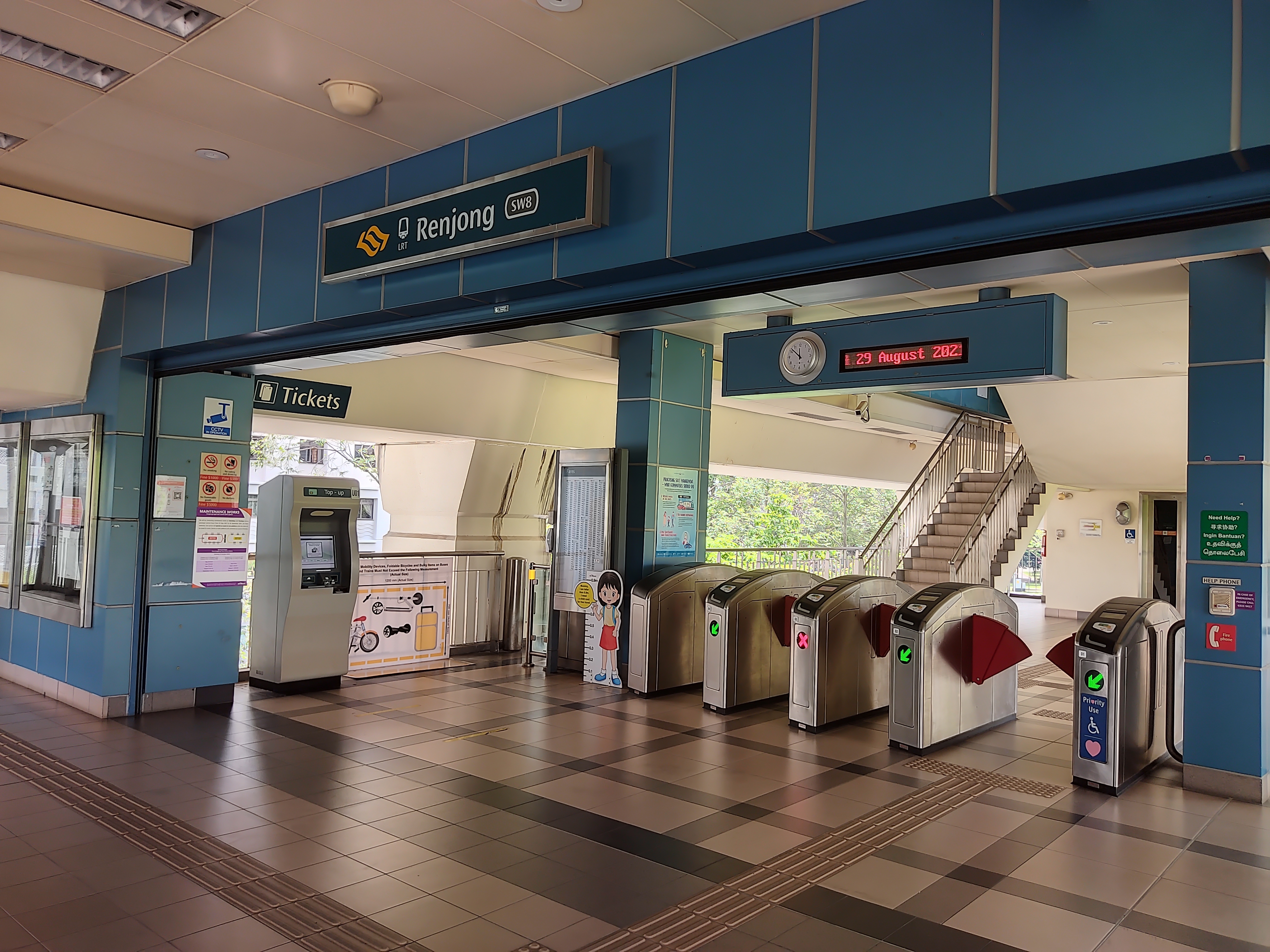
Fare gates at Renjong LRT station.

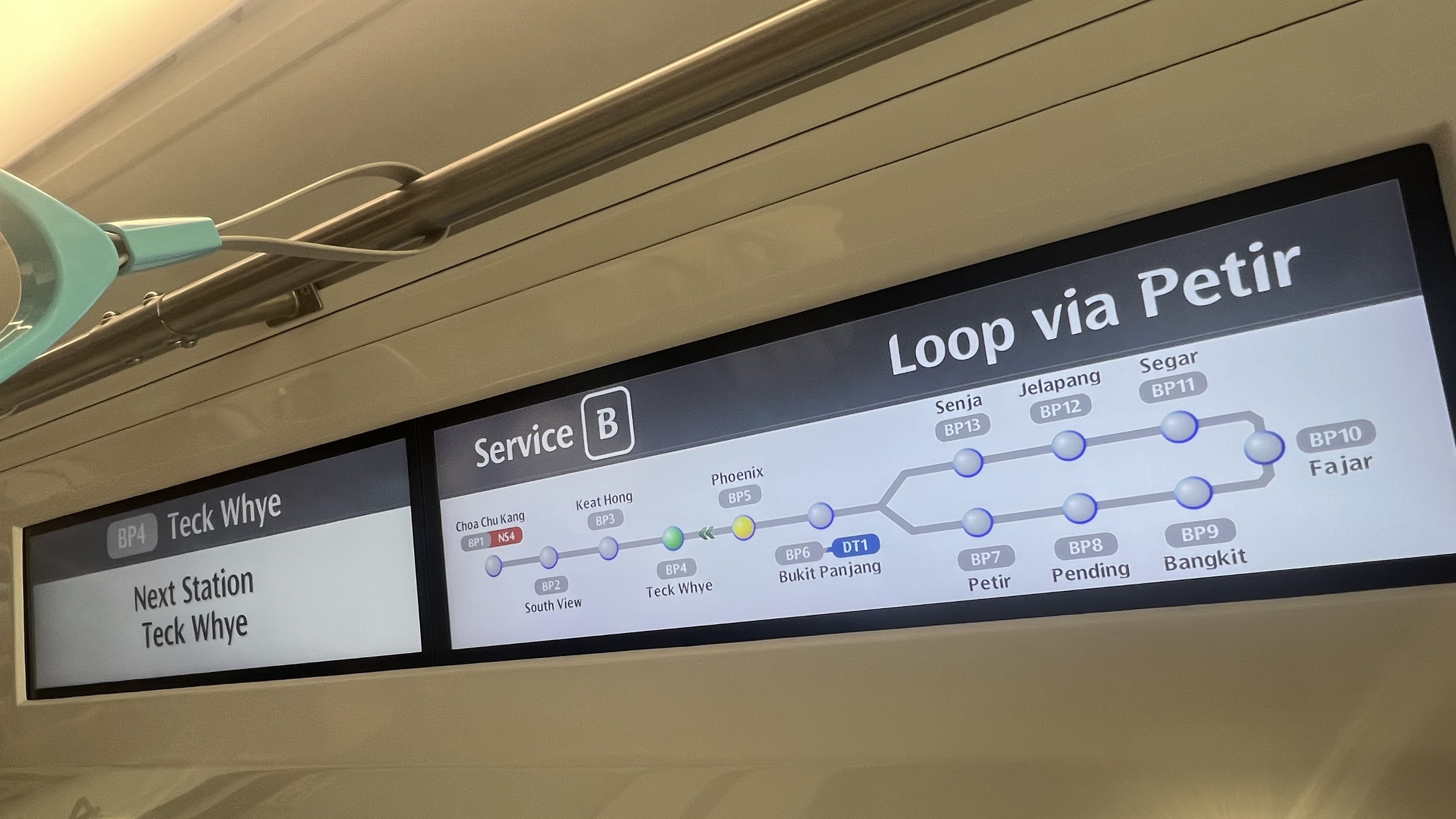
An LCD Dynamic Route Map Display (DRMD) on a C801B train.

Since the LRT system was built in the 1990s, plans for barrier-free facilities have already been included during the planning stages. All 43 stations are equipped with such facilities, thus there will be no difficulties present for the old and handicapped. Barrier-free facilities include lifts, ramps, a tactile guidance system and wider faregates. These barrier-free facilities will be included in all future LRT stations.

=== Lines ===
==== Bukit Panjang LRT (BPLRT) ====
The Bukit Panjang LRT line (BPLRT) is the first light rail line in Singapore. Spanning 7.6 km and consisting of 13 stations, the entire line opened in 1999 and is the first and only LRT line to be operated by SMRT Trains.

==== Sengkang LRT (SKLRT) ====
The Sengkang LRT line (SKLRT) is a 10.7 km light rail line which partially opened on 18 January 2003. It is part of the LRT system together with the other two lines. The East Loop has 5 stations, all operational, from Compassvale to Ranggung whereas the West Loop has 8 stations from Cheng Lim to Renjong. On 27 June 2015, Kupang opened, making it the last station on the Sengkang LRT to be opened. The completion of several new residential developments in the area deemed it suitable to operate after 12 years.

==== Punggol LRT (PGLRT) ====
The Punggol LRT line (PGLRT) is a light rail line in Singapore within the LRT system together with the other two lines. Its first phase, which comprises a 10.3 km light rail line with 15 stations, began operating on 29 January 2005 (with the exception of Oasis, which was opened on 15 June 2007 and Damai, which was opened on 20 June 2011) whereas Nibong, Sumang and Soo Teck were opened on 29 June 2014, the rest of the stations are not opened as Punggol was halfway developed. Subsequently, Sam Kee opened on 29 February 2016, Punggol Point opened on 29 December 2016 while Samudera opened on 31 March 2017 as the area around the stations became more developed. Teck Lee opened on 15 August 2024, in conjunction with the Singapore Institute of Technology campus, making it the last station on the Punggol LRT to be opened.

=== Rolling stock ===
| Line | Family | Name | No. of Trains | Service Start | Service End | Speed Limit | Notes |
|---|---|---|---|---|---|---|---|
| Bukit Panjang | Bombardier Innovia APM 100 | C801 | 19 | 1999 | 2025 | 60 km/h (37 mph) | Initially named the CX-100. Gradually decommissioned since 2023 to be replaced by the APM 300 C801B. |
| Bukit Panjang | Bombardier Innovia APM 100 | C801A | 13 | 2014 | —N/a | 60 km/h (37 mph) | |
| Bukit Panjang | Bombardier Innovia APM 300 | C801B | 19 | 2024 | —N/a | 60 km/h (37 mph) | Replacing the APM 100 C801. |
| Sengkang and Punggol | Mitsubishi Crystal Mover | C810 | 41 | 2003 | —N/a | 80 km/h (50 mph) | To be replaced by the C810D. |
| Sengkang and Punggol | Mitsubishi Crystal Mover | C810A | 16 | 2016 | —N/a | 80 km/h (50 mph) | |
| Sengkang and Punggol | Mitsubishi Crystal Mover | C810D | 33 | 2025 | —N/a | 80 km/h (50 mph) | Will replace the C810. |

The trains on the LRT system are fitted with rubber tyres, rather than steel wheels, on specially-constructed guideways from which its power is also sourced. All cars are fully automated and driverless, and are controlled from their respective depots.

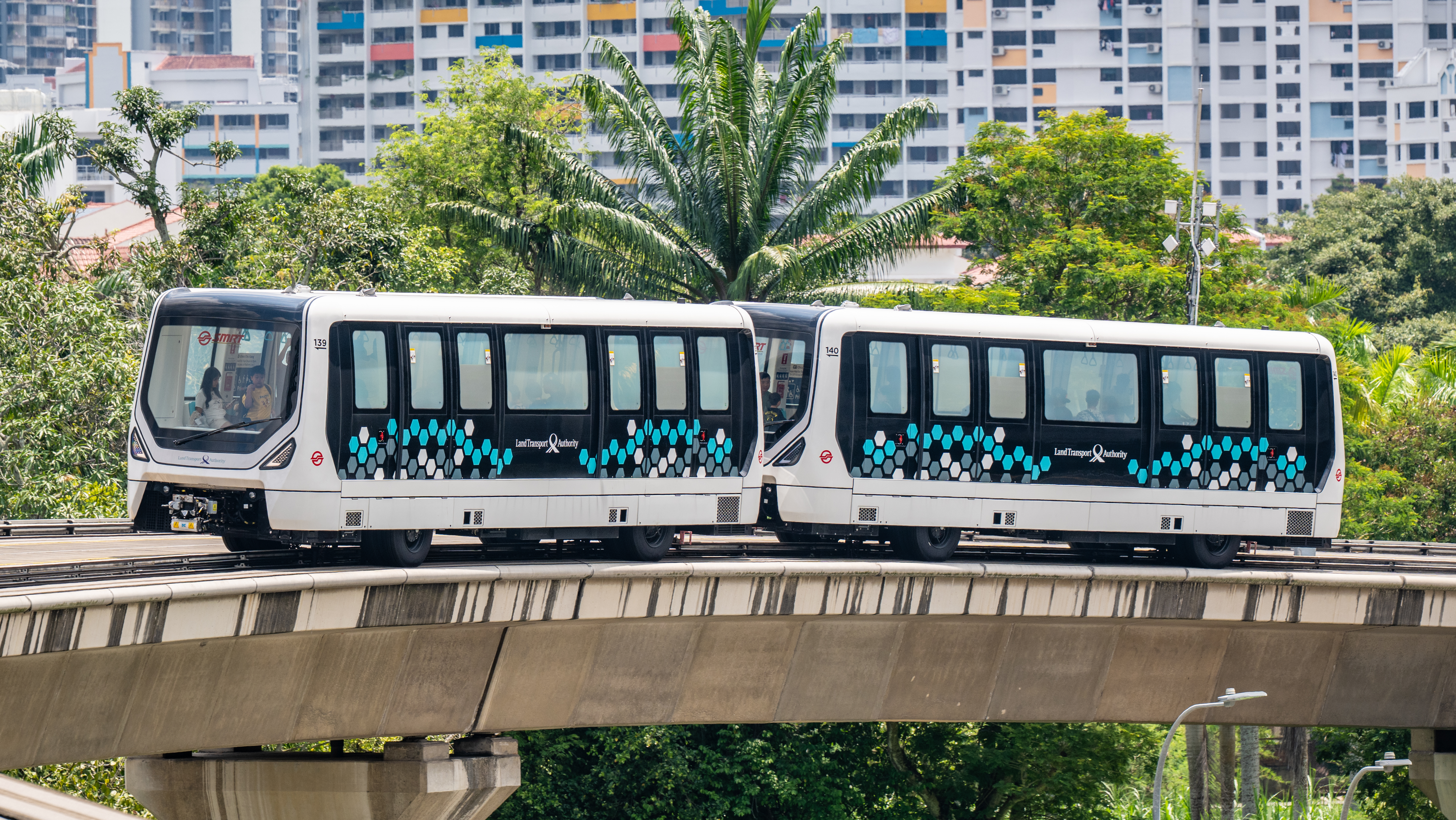
A Bombardier Innovia APM 300R C801B running on the guiderails.

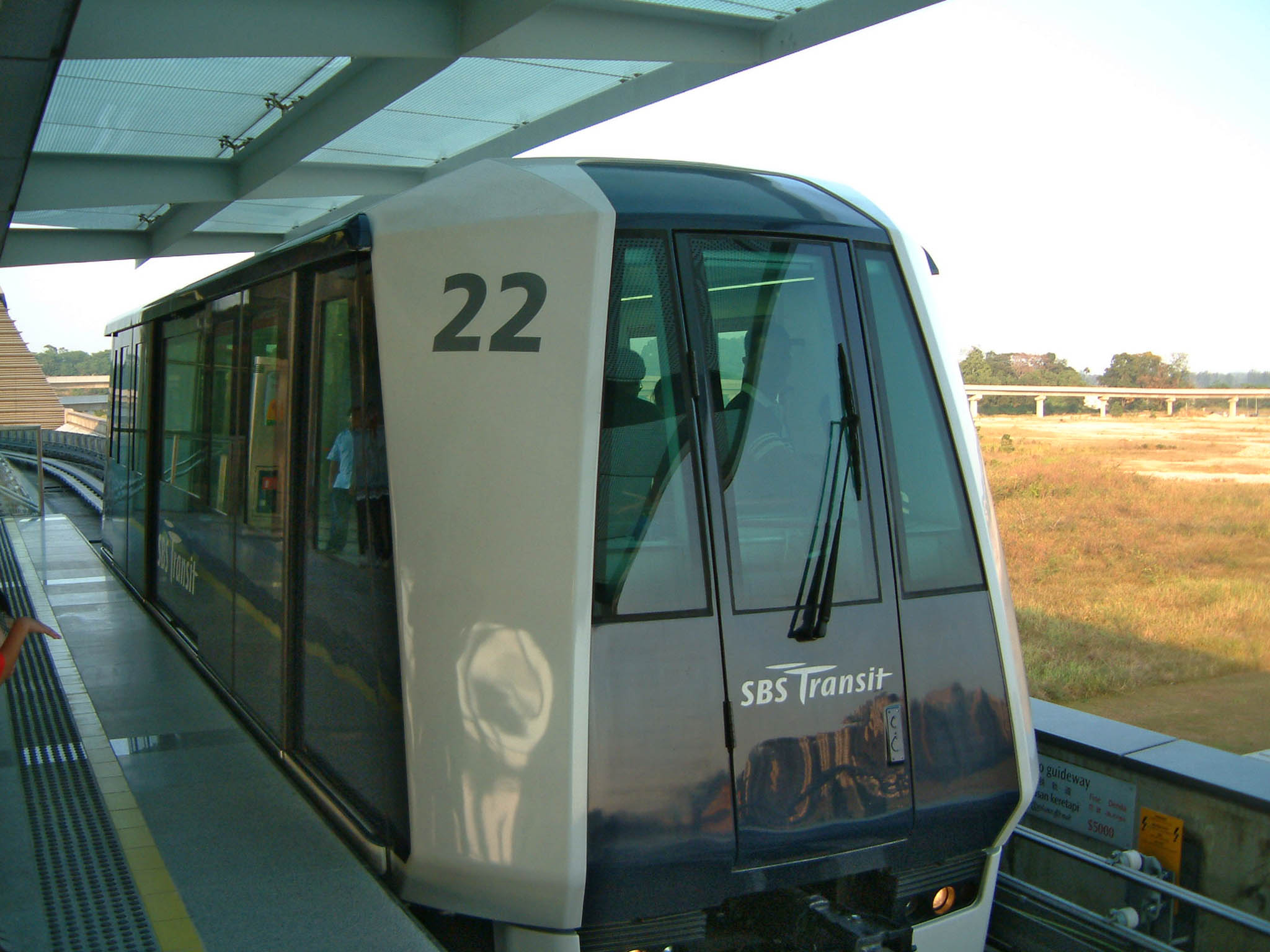
A Crystal Mover C810 on the Punggol LRT system at Punggol LRT station.

=== Signalling ===
All lines are capable of fully automatic operation, where they can operate driverless and unattended.

The following list documents the systems:

| Line | Supplier | Solution | Type | Commissioned | Length (km) | Centre | Remarks |
|---|---|---|---|---|---|---|---|
| Bukit Panjang LRT | Bombardier | CITYFLO 550 | Fixed block | 1999 | 7.8 | Ten Mile Junction Depot | To be decommissioned by end-2025 |
| Bukit Panjang LRT | Bombardier | CITYFLO 650 | Moving block; CBTC (Note: Using radio) | 2025 | 7.8 | Ten Mile Junction Depot | To be fully implemented by end-2025 |
| Sengkang LRT | Kyosan | APM Signalling | Fixed block | 2003/2005 | 10.7 | Sengkang Depot | |
| Punggol LRT | Kyosan | APM Signalling | Fixed block | 2005/2014 | 10.3 | Sengkang Depot | |

=== Depots ===
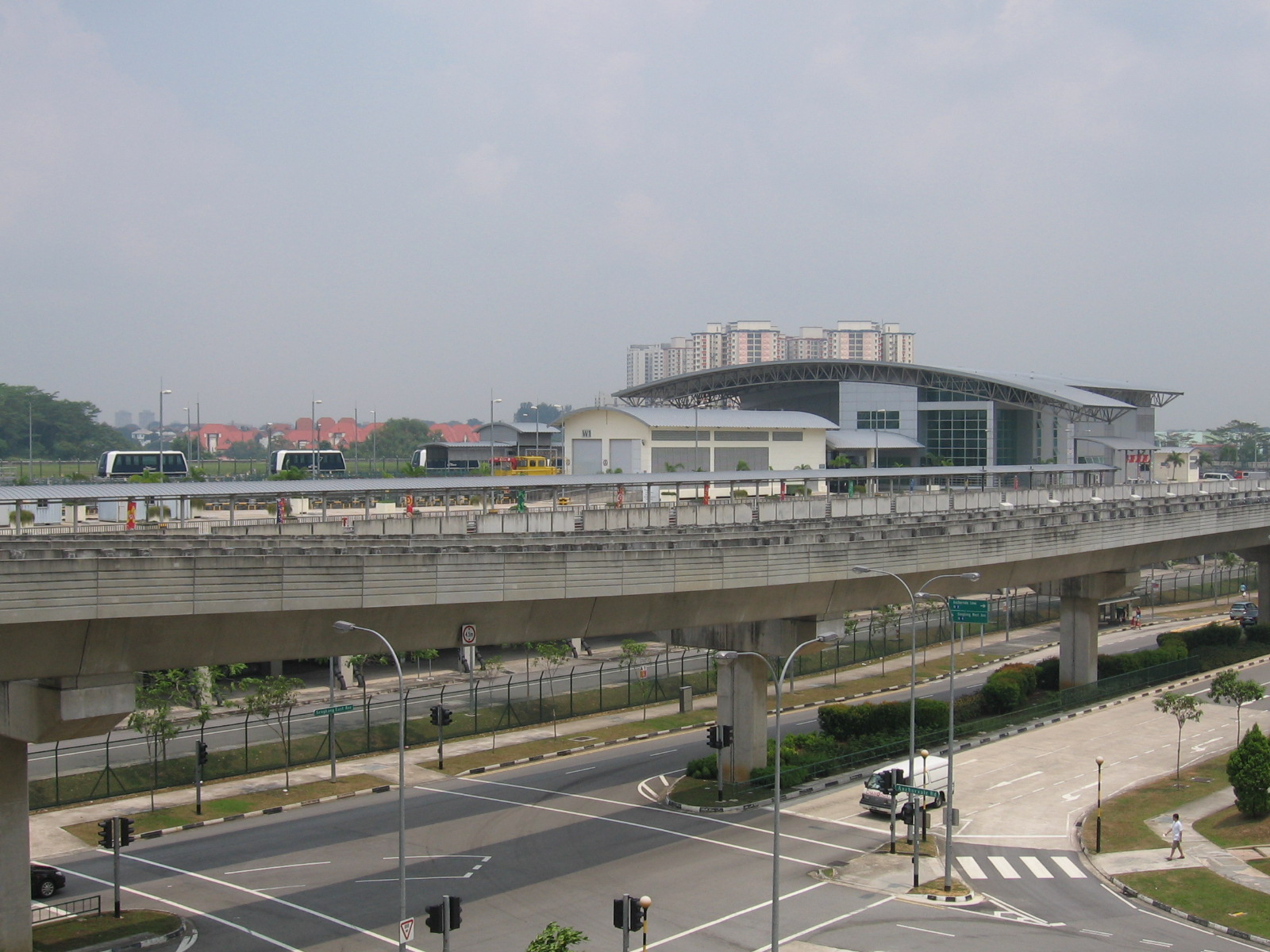
Most LRT trains on the Sengkang–Punggol LRT lines are parked at the top level of Sengkang Depot.

The LRT system consists of two depots, which run the maintenance, inspection, train overhaul facilities, and houses the train cars overnight. The Ten Mile Junction Depot houses train cars for Bukit Panjang LRT, and the Sengkang Depot houses train cars for both the Sengkang-Punggol LRT (SPLRT) and the North East Line (NEL) of the Mass Rapid Transit (MRT).

In 2021, LTA announced plans for the expansion of the LRT section of Sengkang Depot. The expanded depot will provide increased stabling capacity, a new maintenance workshop and two new reception tracks to boost the Sengkang-Punggol LRT's (SPLRT) capacity. In addition, the existing power supply systems will be enhanced and three new traction power stations will be added to the existing five for improved traction power to support the additional trains. Expansion works began in 2021 and are scheduled to be completed by 2027.

== Fares and ticketing ==
The Light Rail Transit uses the same ticketing system as the Mass Rapid Transit, accepting the contactless EZ-Link smart card and tourist passes. With the removal of single-trip tickets, all GTM machines were replaced by TUK-A and TUM machines were replaced by TUK. Commuters can still top up at the minimum of $2 for School Smartcard, ITE Student card and Diploma Student card, $5 for persons with disabilities and $10 for adults and Passion Silver using cash. E-payment top-ups remains unchanged at the minimum $5 for students and $10 for adults.

Public transport journeys were paid using MasterCard, NETS, VISA, American Express, CEPAS 3.0 EZ-Link, CEPAS 3.0 Concession, NETS Prepaid and the early CEPAS versions (utilising Card-Based Ticketing (CBT)) of EZ-Link, Concession and NETS stored-value cards (commonly known as NETS FlashPay). As a result, SimplyGo is there for any travel, card and fare enquiries.

Instead of using turnstile faregates, all stations on the Bukit Panjang LRT Line now use retractable faregates instead which is faster and easier and the replacement was completed in 2017.

== Safety ==
By 2018, glass and steel platform barriers were installed at all 43 LRT stations to prevent people from falling onto the tracks. Unlike the ones in overground MRT stations, the LRT structures will not have sliding doors but fixed openings. The barriers have been erected at Choa Chu Kang and Bukit Panjang LRT stations in anticipation of higher commuter traffic with the opening of Downtown Line to Bukit Panjang. This was followed by the rest of the stations on the Bukit Panjang and Sengkang-Punggol LRT lines in 2018.

The installation of these barriers was completed at all LRT stations in 2017.

== See also ==
- List of Singapore LRT stations
- Mass Rapid Transit
- Transport in Singapore
- Rail transport in Singapore
