= C801 (disambiguation) =

C801 usually refers to the Bombardier Innovia APM 100 C801, an automated people mover (APM) in Singapore.

C801 or C-801 may refer to:

- C-801, a Chinese air-to-surface subsonic anti-ship cruise missile
- BAP Almirante Grau (CLM-81), a decommissioned De Zeven Provinciën-class cruiser
