= Phoenix LRT =

Phoenix LRT may refer to:

- Phoenix LRT station, a Light Rail Transit station in Choa Chu Kang, Singapore
- Valley Metro Rail, a light rail system serving the city of Phoenix, Arizona, United States
