= Bombardier Innovia APM 100 C801A =

Class of electric multiple units in Singapore

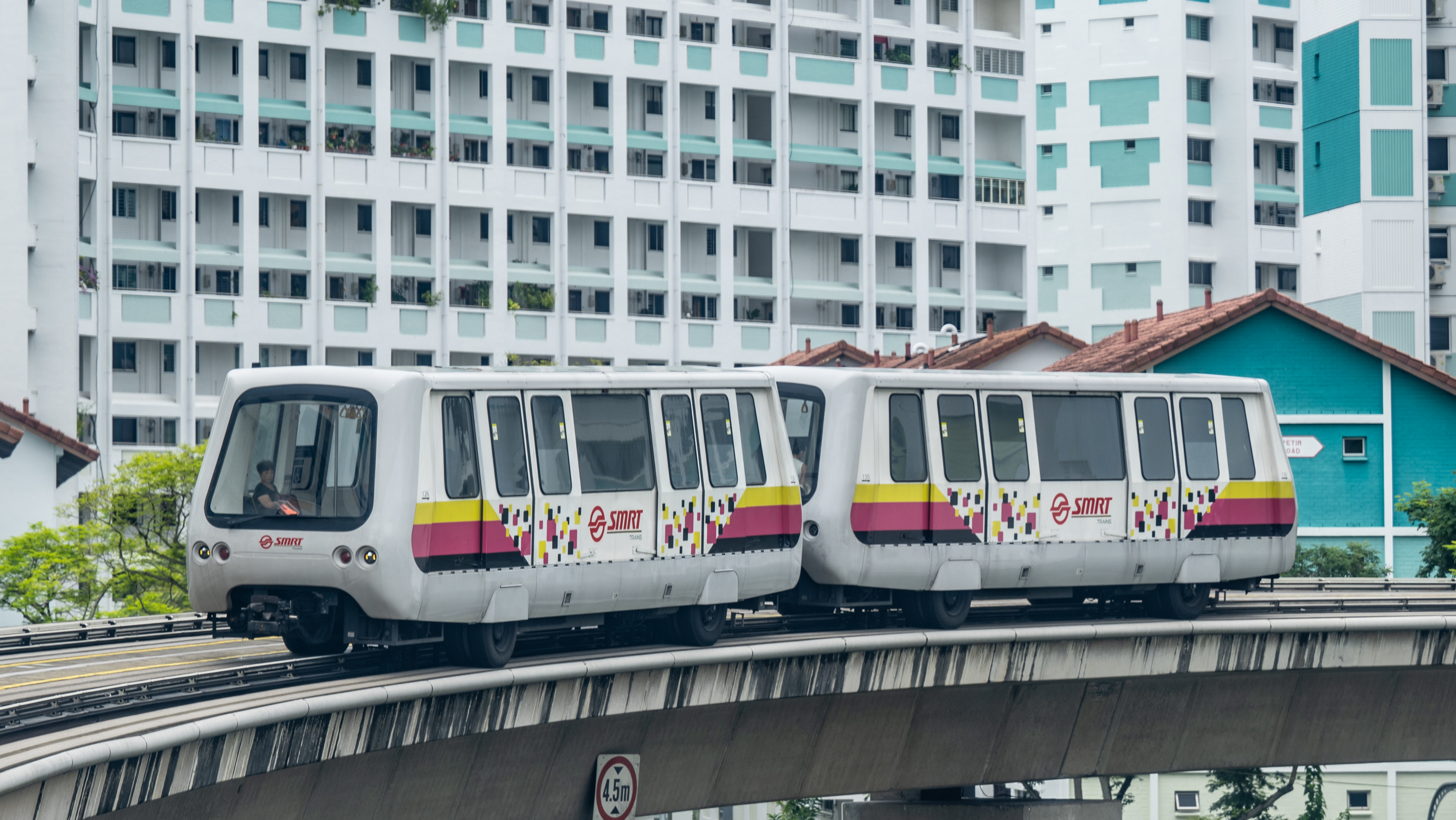
- A Bombardier Innovia APM 100 C801A train on the Bukit Panjang LRT line

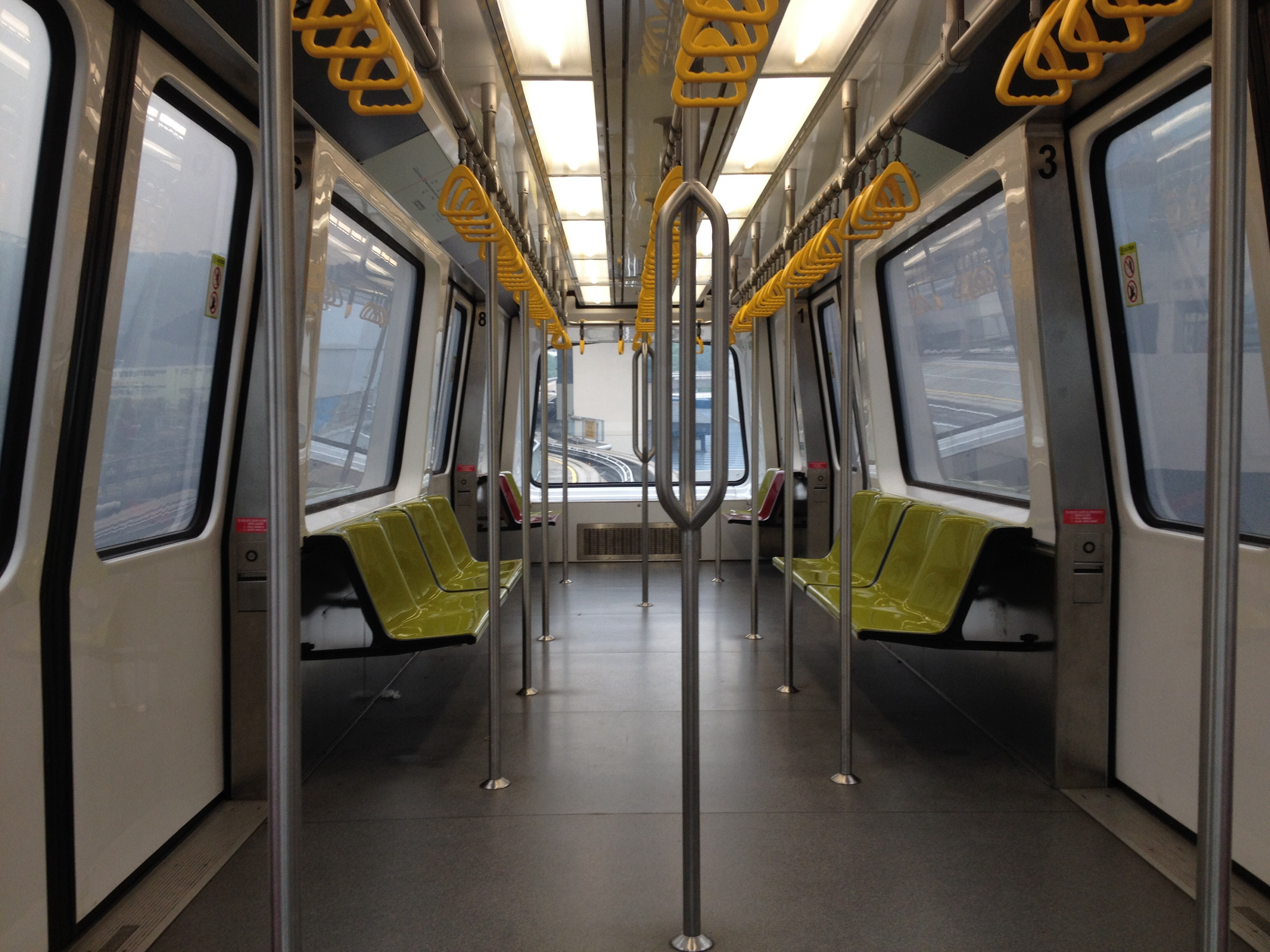
- Interior of Empty C801A train.
- Stock type: Rubber-tyred automatic people mover
- In service: 19 November 2014; 11 years ago – Present
- Manufacturer: Bombardier Transportation (now Alstom)
- Built at: West Mifflin, Pennsylvania, United States
- Family name: Innovia
- Constructed: 2014 – 2015
- Entered service: 19 November 2014; 11 years ago
- Number built: 13 vehicles
- Number in service: 13 vehicles
- Formation: Single vehicles (M) that can be coupled to form 2-car trains
- Fleet numbers: 120 – 132
- Capacity: 22 seated; 83 standing
- Operator: SMRT Trains Ltd (SMRT Corporation)
- Depot: Ten Mile Junction
- Line served: BPLRT Bukit Panjang LRT line

Specifications
- Car body construction: Aluminum
- Train length: 12.8 m (41 ft 11 7/8 in)
- Car length: 12.8 m (41 ft 11 7/8 in)
- Width: 2.8 m (9 ft 2 1/4 in)
- Height: 3.4 m (11 ft 1 7/8 in)
- Doors: 2 × 2 per car
- Maximum speed: 55 km/h (34 mph) (design); 48 km/h (30 mph) (service)
- Weight: 15 t (15 long tons; 17 short tons)
- Traction system: Bombardier thyristor drive
- Traction motors: Bombardier 1460-P4 75 kW (101 hp) DC motor
- Acceleration: 0.8 m/s^{2} (2.6 ft/s^{2})
- Deceleration: 1.2 m/s^{2} (3.9 ft/s^{2}) (service); 1.3 m/s^{2} (4.3 ft/s^{2}) (emergency)
- Electric system: 600 V 50 Hz 3-phase AC third rail
- Current collection: Collector shoe
- UIC classification: AA
- Safety systems: ATC under ATO GoA 4 (UTO), with subsystems of ATP, ATS and CBI: Current: Bombardier CITYFLO 550 fixed block; Future: Alstom Cityflo 650 moving block CBTC
- Coupling system: BSI
- Multiple working: Within type during regular service With C801B during maintenance only
- Headlight type: Circular LED
- Track gauge: 2,642-millimetre (8 ft 8 in) central guideway with rubber tyres

The Bombardier Innovia APM 100 C801A (APM 100) is the second generation of an automated people mover (APM) train built by Bombardier Transportation (now Alstom) for the Bukit Panjang LRT line. These trains are mainly for airport connections and light rail in towns and it is operated by Automatic Train Control (ATC), making it fully automatic and driverless. The use of rubber tyres and ceramic tracks are extremely quiet compared to conventional rail.

This additional batch of trains will increase the capacity of the Bukit Panjang LRT line by 50% by 2014. As of 4 September 2015, all train cars are officially on revenue service.

== Design ==
=== Exterior ===
The APM 100 C801A trains are cosmetically similar to the ECX-100 C801 trains in terms of exterior shape, excluding the ends.

- The trains have circular LED headlights and taillights as compared to the ECX-100 C801 trains, which have rectangular incandescent headlights.
- Windscreens and windows have a grey tint, unlike the ECX-100 C801 whose windows have a green tint.
- The trains also have a more streamlined design and are also the first batch of trains to bear SMRT's "Pixel" livery white paint background with a black, yellow and red band-colours and the square patterns.
- The trains feature an orange indicator light above the window situated between the train doors, which illuminate when the doors are open.
- The trains have automatic windscreen wipers which will activate during wet weather conditions.

=== Interior ===
The APM 100 C801A trains are very similar to the ECX-100 C801 trains in terms of interior design.

- The trains feature longitudinal seats with an ergonomic profile. All seats are coloured yellow-green, except the priority seats near the doors, which are coloured red.
- Additional handgrips have been installed to encourage people to move towards the centre of the car.
- The Visual Passenger Information System displays current and next station information.
- As the carriages are closed-end, the train must be stationary at an LRT Station and the doors must be open for passengers to move between carriages during 2-car operations.
- At each end, passengers may be seated and view the scenery when the train is moving.
- Passengers have the ability to sit on either ends of the car, accommodating more seating space.

== Train formation ==
The C801A trains predominantly operate as two-car configurations in revenue service. With each car equipped with both the motors and the third rail current collectors, these trains can run as only one car, but can also be coupled to run as two cars during revenue service.

The car numbers of the trains range from 120 to 132. Individual cars are assigned a three-digit serial number by the line's operator, SMRT Trains. A trainset consists of one motor car, e.g. set 120 is car 120. The first digit is always a 1, while the last two digits identify the car number.

- Bombardier Transportation built sets 120 – 132.

== Additional features ==
- Some train cars were installed with CCTVs.
