= Bukit Panjang LRT line =

Light rail transit line in Singapore

Bukit Panjang LRT

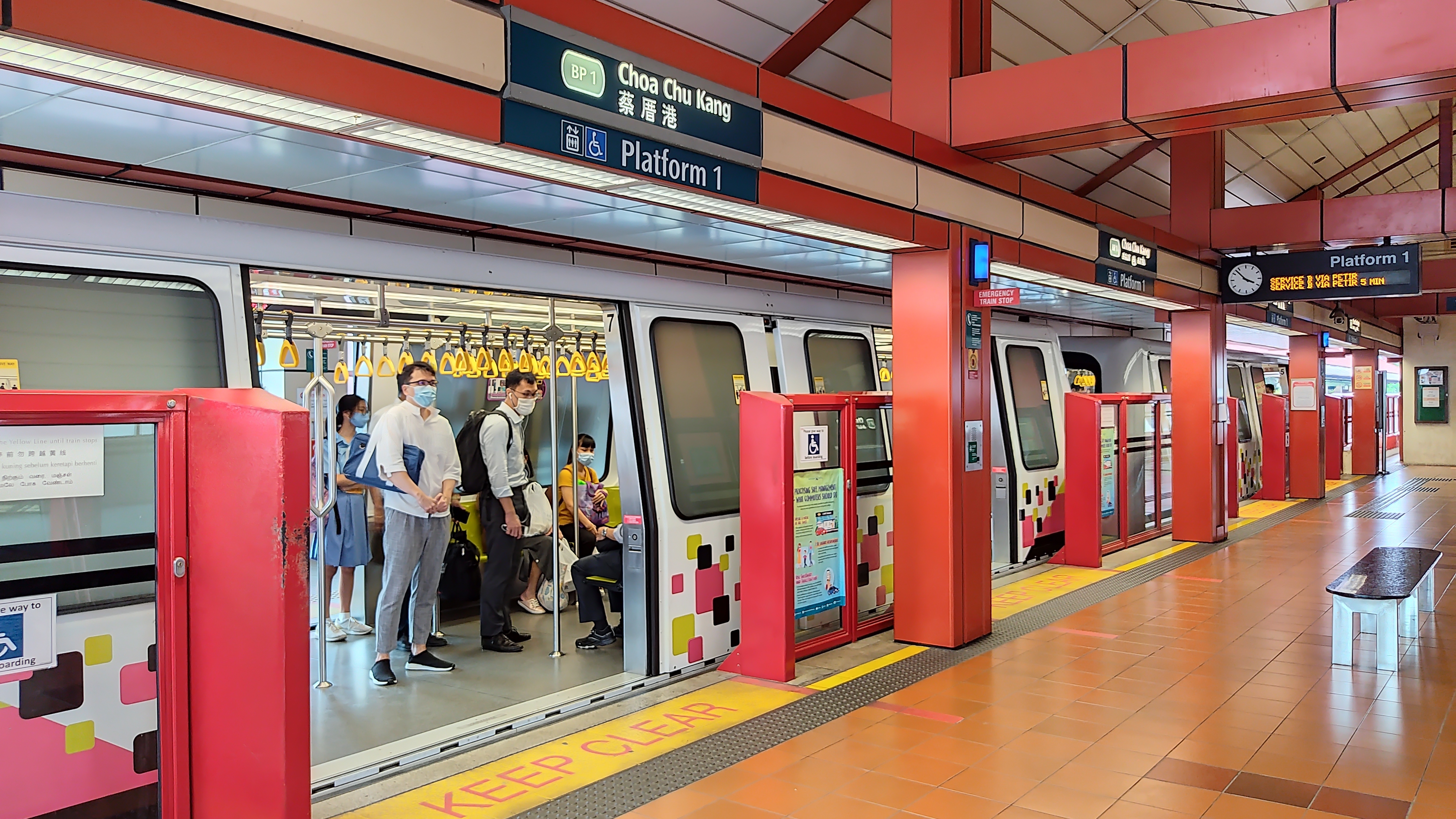
- C801A trains in a two-car formation on the Bukit Panjang LRT.

Overview
- Native name: Malay: Laluan LRT Bukit Panjang; Chinese: 武吉班让轻轨线; Tamil: புக்கிட் பஞ்சாங் வரி
- Status: Operational
- Owner: Land Transport Authority
- Locale: Singapore
- Termini: Choa Chu Kang
- Stations: 13
- Color on map: Grey (#748477)

Service
- Type: Automated guideway transit People mover
- System: Light Rail Transit (Singapore)
- Services: 2
- Operator: SMRT Trains Ltd (SMRT Corporation)
- Depot: Ten Mile Junction
- Rolling stock: Bombardier Innovia APM 100 (C801A); Bombardier Innovia APM 300R (C801B)
- Daily ridership: 64,781 (July 2020)

History
- Opened: 6 November 1999; 27 years ago

Technical
- Line length: 8 km (5.0 mi)
- Character: Fully elevated
- Track gauge: 2,642-millimetre (8 ft 8 in) central guideway with rubber tyres
- Electrification: 600 V 50 Hz 3-phase AC third rail
- Signalling: Current: Bombardier CITYFLO 550 fixed block ATC under ATO GoA 4 (UTO), with subsystems of ATP, ATS and CBI; Future: Alstom Cityflo 650 moving block CBTC ATC under ATO GoA 4 (UTO), with subsystems of ATP, ATS and CBI

Interactive Map

The Bukit Panjang LRT (abbreviation: BPLRT) is an 8-kilometre (5.0 mi) automated guideway transit line in Bukit Panjang, Singapore. The BPLRT is currently the only Light Rail Transit (LRT) line operated by SMRT Trains. As the name suggests, it serves 13 stations in the neighbourhoods of Bukit Panjang and Choa Chu Kang in the north-west area of the country. The line was the first LRT line constructed in Singapore, having been opened on 6 November 1999 by then-Deputy Prime Minister Tony Tan.

It is a fully elevated and automated people mover system. The line currently uses the C801A and C801B rolling stock supplied by Bombardier (now Alstom), running in a two-car formation. With a 20-year design lifespan, a major overhaul of the system began in 2019 that is scheduled to complete in 2026, which include a new signalling system (Innovia APM 300R) and power rails system, as well as rolling stock.

== History ==
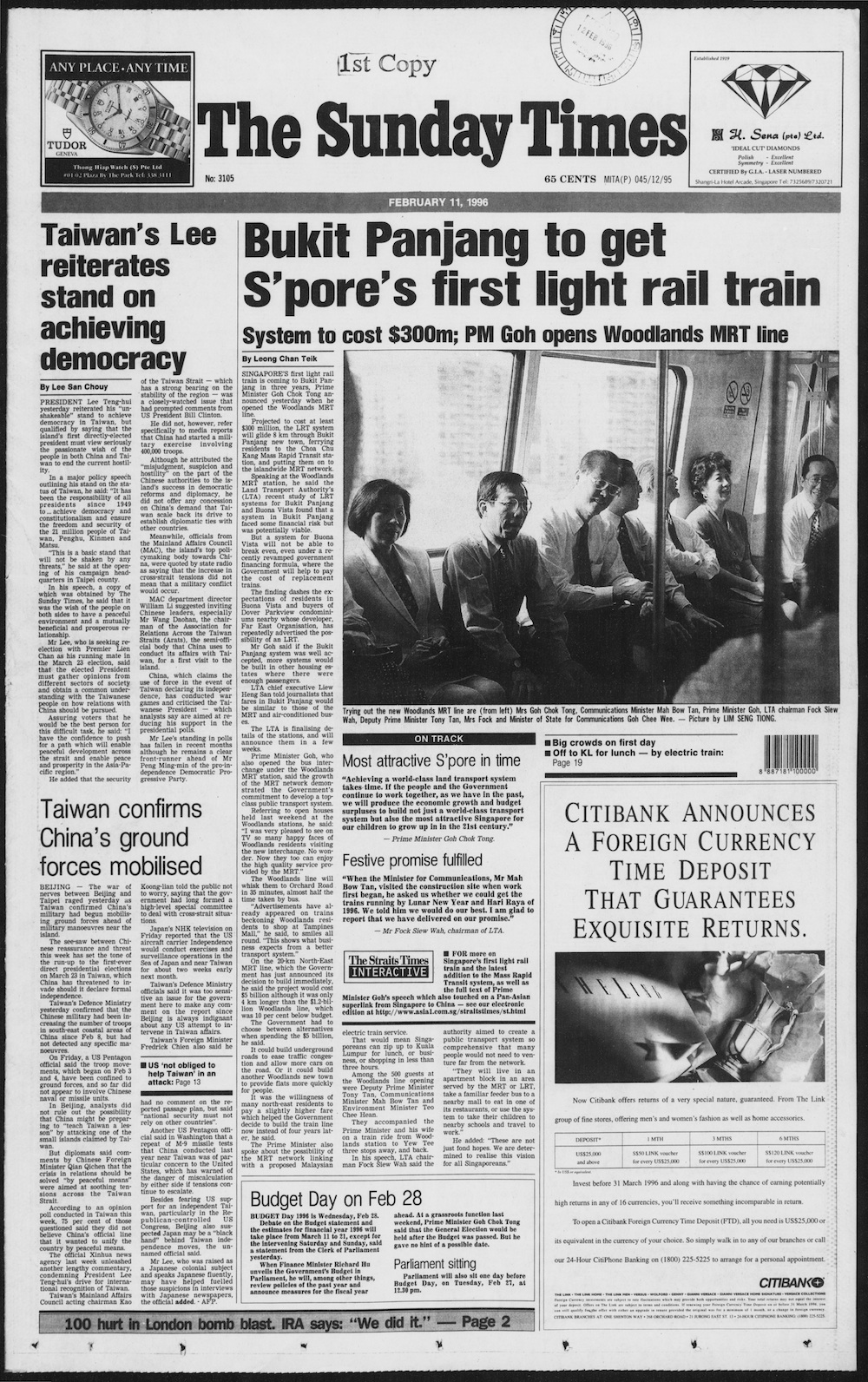
"Bukit Panjang to get Singapore's first light rail train." The headline on page 1 of The Sunday Times on 11 February 1996

=== Planning and construction ===
In November 1994, Communication Minister Mah Bow Tan announced that the Mass Rapid Transit Corporation (MRTC) was conducting studies on the feasibility of a Light Rail Transit (LRT) system in the estate of Bukit Panjang. Subsequently, Bukit Panjang was one of the two locations selected for the construction of the first LRT systems in Singapore in December 1994, the other being at Queenstown and linked to Buona Vista MRT station, the latter of which was eventually not built. The tender for the design and construction of the LRT system in Bukit Panjang were called in December 1994, receiving eight bids.

In February 1996, Prime Minister Goh Chok Tong announced that an LRT system in Bukit Panjang had been given the go-ahead, and was expected to be completed in three years. An exhibition about the system was organised by the Land Transport Authority (LTA) in April 1996, featuring models and maps of the stations on the line, and a booth at which visitors could vote for the colours of the rolling stock, and the shape of the station roofs. In the same month, the contract for the system's design and construction was awarded to a consortium consisting of Keppel Corporation, Gammon, and Adtranz for S$285 million.

On 5 August 1997, the LTA awarded SMRT a license to operate the LRT due to its experience with the MRT system. Testing on the line was underway by December 1998 and it commenced operations on 6 November 1999.

=== Reliability issues ===
Upon opening, the system suffered from reliability issues, having 32 service disruptions in its first six months of operation. Safety concerns regarding the system were also raised in Parliament in the wake of a collision between two trains in November 2000 that injured five passengers. Most of these issues were rectified by September 2001, and, by May 2002, the system was able to attain the government's desired service levels.

However, a subsequent five-day service disruption in October 2002, caused by a loose guide wheel, led the LTA to conduct an audit on the maintenance procedures carried out for the line. The audit found that the training and procedures for maintenance were adequate, but the actual maintenance work was not properly done, and the LTA gave the line's operator, Singapore LRT, six months to rectify the lapses found in the audit.

To rectify the issues with the system, Singapore LRT spent S$350,000 to replace worn-out wires in the line's signalling system, from December 2003 to April 2004. Service levels on the line had improved to adequate standards by 2003, but a subsequent disruption of service in May 2004 led to the line's operator initiating an internal probe into the matter.

Besides the reliability issues, the line was doing poorly financially, with Singapore LRT making annual losses of around S$2 million to S$3 million. Ridership on the line was also low, with around 40,000 commuters daily, 10,000 less than needed to break even, and was not expected to increase further, given a development slowdown in Bukit Panjang.

=== Upgrades and capacity increases ===
By 2010, ridership on the line had increased significantly, to around 47,000 commuters daily, and was expected to increase further. As the trains on the line had limited capacity to meet the demand, in November 2010, SMRT announced that they were contemplating capacity increases on the line. These capacity increases, in the form of 13 additional train cars, and a supplementary bus service between heavily used stations on the line and Choa Chu Kang, were announced by then-Transport Minister Lui Tuck Yew in July 2011. In addition, SMRT contracted Bombardier to conduct a study on how to improve the line's reliability. The new trains entered service on the line in 2015.

In a bid to further improve reliability, in June 2015, the LTA and SMRT announced upgrades to the track, signalling systems, and electrical systems along the line, as faults in these areas had caused most of the service disruptions on the line. Later that month, Lui elaborated that the upgrades would comprise a 12-month study period to identify issues to rectify, and a several years long period in which the upgrades would be implemented. Additional staff were also deployed to improve service recovery and platform barriers were installed at all stations along the line by 2017.

In October 2016, as the line was approaching its 20-year design lifespan, LTA and SMRT announced that they were considering several courses of action regarding the system. These comprised the renewal of the existing system, or its complete replacement, either with a new system or with buses. On 8 March 2017, it was announced that the system's power supply, signalling, rolling stock, track, and stations along with a new signalling system would be upgraded. The authorities ruled out scrapping the entire system or changing to automated guided vehicles drawn on self-power as it would cause major traffic congestion. On 3 October 2017, a tender for the revamp was called. To improve service reliability in the interim period, SMRT shortened operating hours on all Sundays from 12 November 2017 until the end of that year, which SMRT said allowed for additional time for maintenance.

On 7 March 2018, LTA awarded the contract for $344 million to Bombardier, the original supplier of the rolling stock, to fully upgrade the system. This includes overhauling the line's signalling system with a communications-based train control (CBTC) system for a tighter headway between each train and thus, reducing waiting time. The 19 first-generation trains will be removed from service and replaced while the 13 second-generation trains will be refurbished. These upgrades are slated to be completed by 2026.

== Network and operations ==
=== Route ===
Covering a distance of 8 kilometres (5.0 miles), the fully elevated line has 13 stations, and connects Bukit Panjang with Choa Chu Kang MRT/LRT station. From Choa Chu Kang station, the line runs east along Choa Chu Kang Way and Choa Chu Kang Road, before making a loop around Bukit Panjang.

=== Services ===
There are two services currently operating on the line: A and B, both of which terminate at Choa Chu Kang. Since 30 December 2024, Service A resumed full day operation on the weekdays.

Service	Terminal	via	Direction
Currently operational
A	Choa Chu Kang	Senja	Senja to Petir; Clockwise direction
B	Choa Chu Kang	Petir	Petir to Senja; Anti-clockwise direction
Defunct
C	Ten Mile Junction	Senja	Clockwise direction

=== Stations ===
All stations, except Choa Chu Kang, have two facing side platforms. Choa Chu Kang was originally an island platform until 2016, when two additional side platforms were constructed on the sides of existing tracks to form a Spanish solution, unique amongst Singapore MRT and LRT stations. An additional set of fare gates were also installed to ease crowding during peak hours.

All the stations on the LRT have half-height platform barriers, installed between 2016 and 2017. These platform barriers have fixed openings instead of platform doors, which the LTA attributed to insufficient space on the station platforms to install the equipment needed for platform doors.

The stations on the line sport a conventional barrel-roof design, which was chosen by the Bukit Panjang residents when the BPLRT was being constructed.

Bukit Panjang LRT line stations timeline
Date	Description
6 November 1999	Opening of Bukit Panjang LRT (14 stations)
10 December 2010	Temporary closure of Ten Mile Junction
30 December 2011	Reopening of Ten Mile Junction
13 January 2019	Permanent closure of Ten Mile Junction

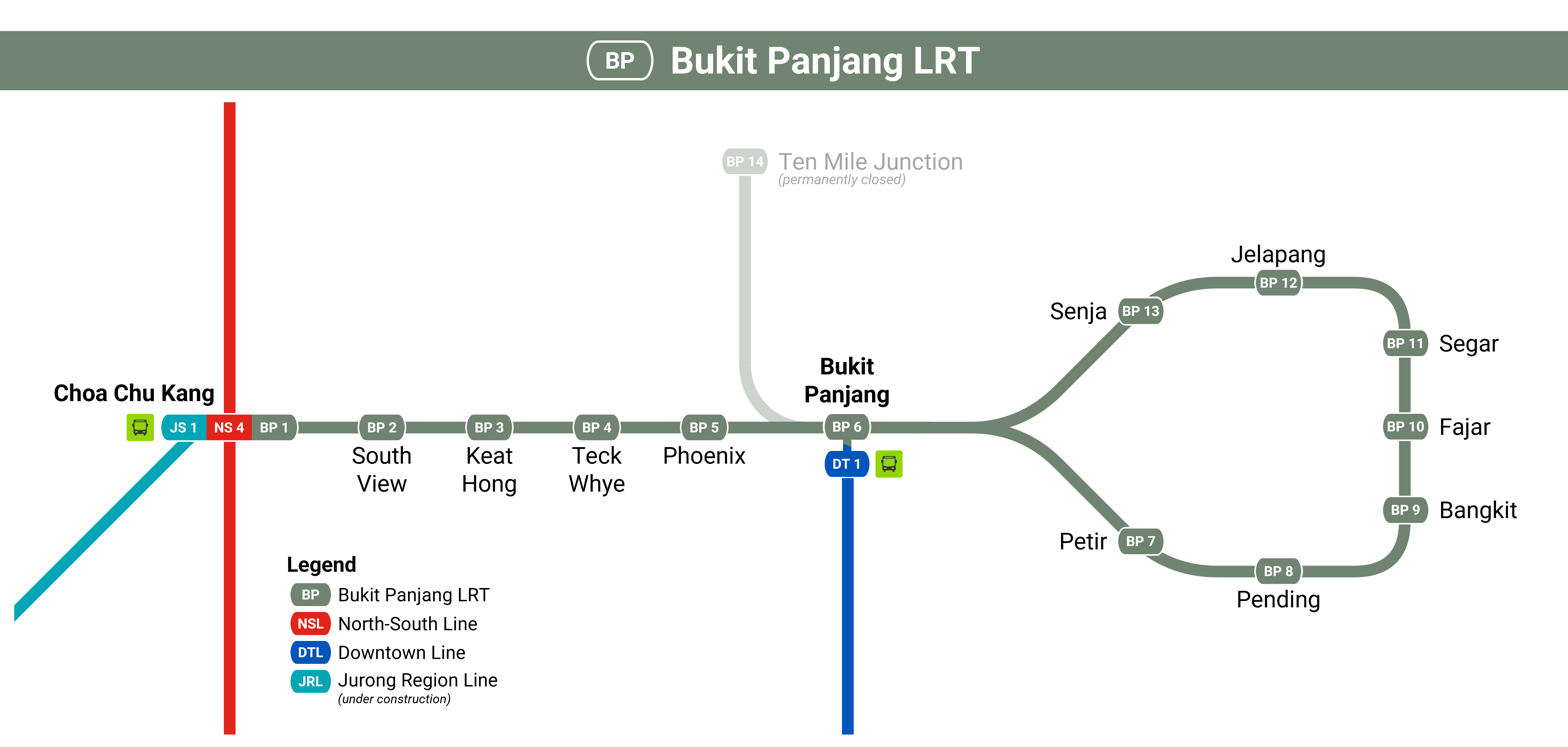
Map of the Bukit Panjang LRT and its stations. Note that the current map displays the BPLRT route differently. For illustrative purposes, this illustration is based on the old map, which features the closed Ten Mile Junction.

==== List ====
Station code	Name	Images	Interchange; Adjacent transportation	Opening	Location(s)
BP1 NS4 JS1	Choa Chu Kang		North–South Line; Jurong Region Line (mid-2028) ― Choa Chu Kang	6 November 1999; 27 years ago	Choa Chu Kang
BP2	South View		—	6 November 1999; 27 years ago	Choa Chu Kang
BP3	Keat Hong		—	6 November 1999; 27 years ago	Choa Chu Kang
BP4	Teck Whye		—	6 November 1999; 27 years ago	Choa Chu Kang
BP5	Phoenix		—	6 November 1999; 27 years ago	Choa Chu Kang
BP6 – DT1	Bukit Panjang		Downtown Line ― Bukit Panjang	6 November 1999; 27 years ago	Bukit Panjang
BP7	Petir		—	6 November 1999; 27 years ago	Bukit Panjang
BP8	Pending		—	6 November 1999; 27 years ago	Bukit Panjang
BP9	Bangkit		—	6 November 1999; 27 years ago	Bukit Panjang
BP10	Fajar		—	6 November 1999; 27 years ago	Bukit Panjang
BP11	Segar		—	6 November 1999; 27 years ago	Bukit Panjang
BP12	Jelapang		—	6 November 1999; 27 years ago	Bukit Panjang
BP13	Senja		—	6 November 1999; 27 years ago	Bukit Panjang
BP14	Ten Mile Junction		Closed down since 13 January 2019	6 November 1999; 27 years ago	Choa Chu Kang

== Rolling stock ==
The Bukit Panjang LRT operates on the Bombardier Innovia APM 100 rolling stock, similar to the ones used by the Changi Airport Skytrain until 2006. An initial 19 trainsets were delivered in 1999 under C801, which bear a cerulean livery. An additional 13 trainsets were delivered in 2014 under C801A, bearing SMRT's pixel livery and a slightly different exterior design. Each unit is 12.8 metres (41 ft 11.9 in) long.

These trains, also known as automated people movers, are rubber-tyred for minimised operating noise within built-up areas and guided by a central guideway which also contains a power rail. They operate in both single-car and double-car arrangements, paired with a similar model (C801 and C801A trainsets are not cross-coupled). The trains are also equipped with windows that fog up automatically when the train runs near residential buildings.

19 Bombardier Innovia APM 300R trains have been procured under C801B as part of the Bukit Panjang LRT overhaul. These trains will be equipped with Communications Based Train Control (CBTC) signalling system and are replacing the first generation C801 trains.

=== Train formation ===
Between 1999 and 2015, the trains operated in one-car (M) formations throughout the day. Two-car formations were only operated during weekday peak hours to accommodate increased demand prior to the introduction of C801A trains in 2014. Service B used to operate 2-car sets only during weekday morning peak hours, while Service A mostly operated them during weekday evening peak hours.

From 2015 until 2019, the majority of trains operated in two-car (M-M) formations. Two-car formations were no longer limited to peak hours due to the increase in ridership and number of apartments in Bukit Panjang.

Since 2019, all of the trains are running in two-car (M-M) formations throughout the day. The units are limited to a two-car train formation because of station length. Coupling is usually done in Ten Mile Junction Depot and the trains are coupled with the same car type for passenger service, i.e. C801B trains can only be coupled with other C801B trains. Occasionally, units are mixed off-service for reasons such as train rescue operations or testing.

== Train control ==
The line is equipped with Bombardier's CITYFLO 550 fixed block signalling system for automatic train control (ATC) under automatic train operation (ATO) GoA 4 (UTO). The subsystems consist of automatic train protection (ATP) to govern train speed, Automatic Train Supervision (ATS) to track and schedule trains, and a computer-based interlocking (CBI) system that prevents incorrect signal and track points settings.

The line is currently being upgraded to use Alstom’s Cityflo 650 moving block communications-based train control (CBTC) signalling system with the gradual rollout of Bombardier Innovia APM 300R C801B trains and retrofitting of Bombardier Innovia APM 100 C801A trains.
