= Bombardier Innovia APM 100 C801 =

Class of electric multiple units in Singapore

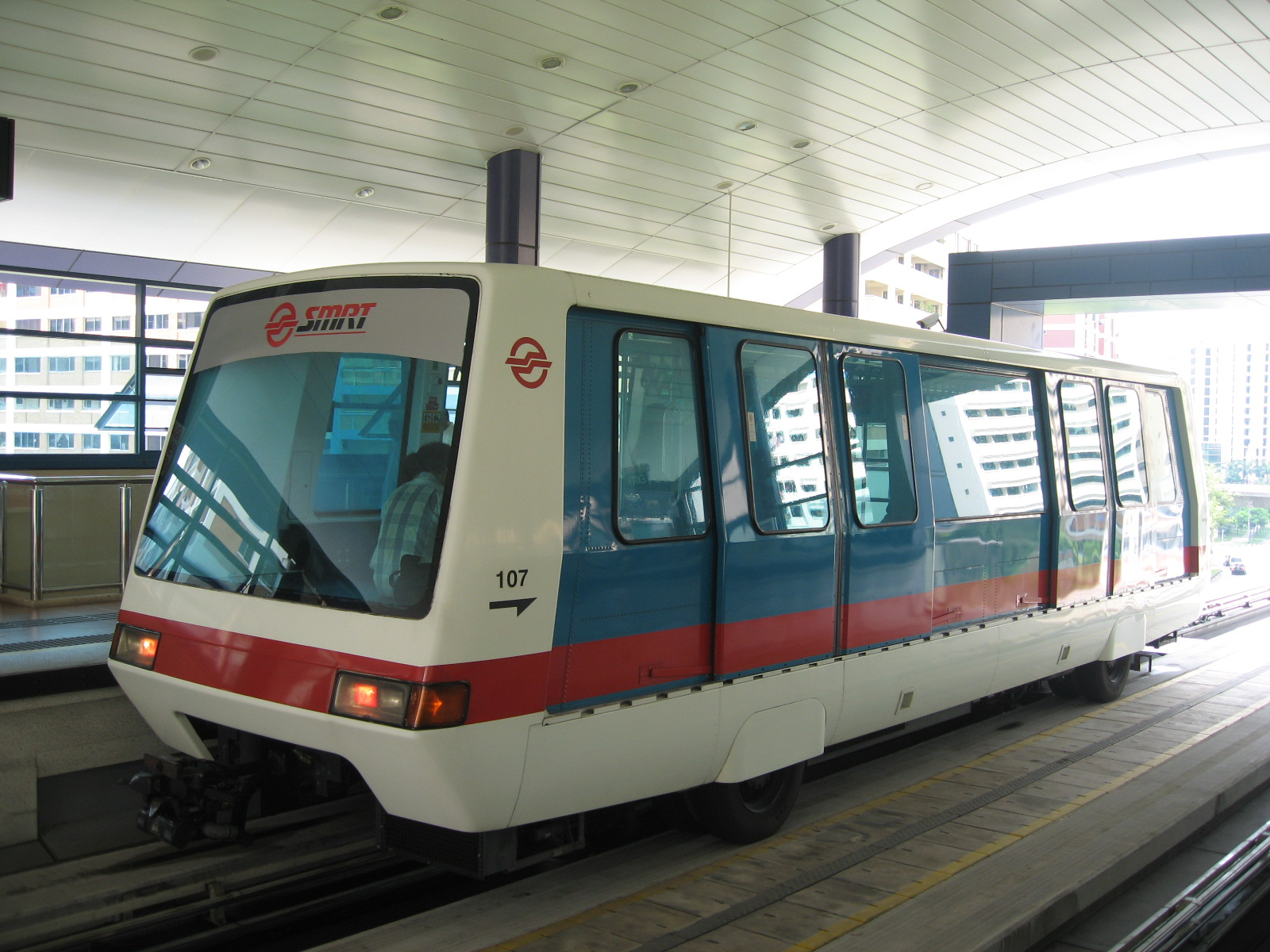
- A Bombardier Innovia APM 100 C801 train.

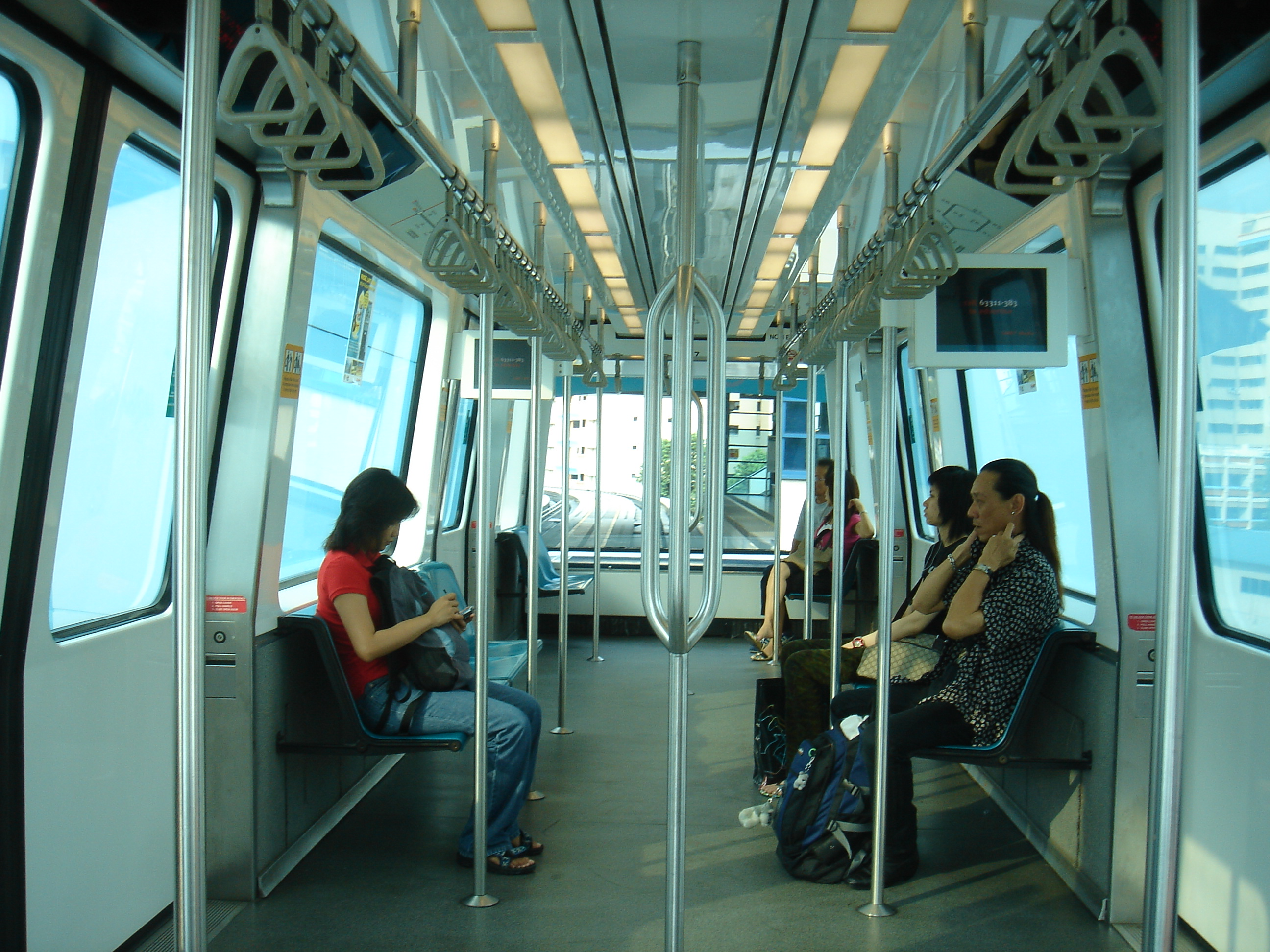
- Interior of Bombardier Innovia APM 100 C801 train.
- Stock type: Rubber-tyred automatic people mover
- In service: 6 November 1999 – 12 September 2025 (25 years, 310 days)
- Manufacturers: Adtranz (later Bombardier Transportation, now Alstom)
- Built at: West Mifflin, Pennsylvania, United States
- Family name: Innovia
- Constructed: 1997 – 1999
- Entered service: 6 November 1999; 26 years ago
- Retired: 17 October 2025; 10 months ago
- Scrapped: November 2023 – October 2025
- Number built: 19 vehicles
- Number preserved: 1 vehicle
- Number scrapped: 18 vehicles
- Successor: Bombardier Innovia APM 300R C801B
- Formation: Single vehicles (M) that can be coupled to form 2-car trains
- Fleet numbers: 101 – 119
- Capacity: 22 seated; 83 standing
- Operator: SMRT Trains Ltd (SMRT Corporation)
- Depot: Ten Mile Junction
- Line served: BPLRT Bukit Panjang LRT line

Specifications
- Car body construction: Aluminium
- Train length: 12.8 m (41 ft 11 7/8 in)
- Car length: 12.8 m (41 ft 11 7/8 in)
- Width: 2.8 m (9 ft 2 1/4 in)
- Height: 3.4 m (11 ft 1 7/8 in)
- Doors: 2 × 2 per car
- Maximum speed: 55 km/h (34 mph) (design); 48 km/h (30 mph) (service)
- Weight: 15 t (15 long tons; 17 short tons)
- Traction system: Bombardier thyristor drive
- Traction motors: Bombardier 1460-P4 75 kW (101 hp) DC motor
- Acceleration: 1.0 m/s^{2} (2.2 mph/s)
- Deceleration: 1.2 m/s^{2} (2.7 mph/s) (service); 1.3 m/s^{2} (2.9 mph/s) (emergency)
- Electric system: 600 V 50 Hz 3-phase AC third rail
- Current collection: Collector shoe
- UIC classification: AA
- Safety systems: Bombardier CITYFLO 550 fixed block ATC under ATO GoA 4 (UTO), with subsystems of ATP, ATS and CBI
- Coupling system: BSI
- Multiple working: Within type during regular service With C801A during maintenance only
- Headlight type: Rectangular incandescent
- Track gauge: 2,642-millimetre (8 ft 8 in) central guideway with rubber tyres

The Bombardier Innovia APM 100 C801 (APM 100, originally known as ECX-100) was the first generation of an automated people mover (APM) train built by Adtranz (later acquired by Bombardier Transportation and subsequently by Alstom) for use on the Bukit Panjang LRT (BPLRT), Singapore.

From August 2024, the APM 300R C801B vehicles began replacing all C801 vehicles, which was fully completed in September 2025.

== Operational history ==
The C801 trains were in operation since the opening of the Bukit Panjang LRT in 1999. The first train was delivered on 21 January 1999, which was painted in cerulean blue train cars and two turquoise stripes pasted. Later on, since December 2004, the trains were refurbished with the replacing of "Adtranz ECX-100" into "Bombardier Innovia APM 100", and repainted into a single red stripe pasted on the same cerulean blue car. These trains used to have LCD displays on each train for advertising purposes, however, these were removed in 2009 due to lack of demand. Currently, the Visual Passenger Information System (VPIS) display current and next station information. The windscreens and windows are tinted green, while spoilt windows have a different tint. The vehicles have rectangular incandescent headlights and taillights.

Some train cars were installed with solar windscreen on one of the car ends. This was to minimise heat and light from entering the trains, which were one of the main causes for warmer trains. The experimental windscreens were successful as they were subsequently rolled out to other train cars.

Car 116 was installed with the new bright LEDs that was used in the C801A trains, replacing the existing yellow headlights. All train cars except for six of them, have been replaced by brand new LED headlights. As the carriages are closed-end, the train must be stationary at an LRT Station and the doors must be open for passengers to move between carriages during 2-car operations. Passengers have the ability to sit on the either end of the car, which creates more standing space. All seats in the interior are standardised into teal colour seats, which is the previous LRT colour before it was standardised into grey in 2003. It has 4 seats on each end and 8 seats in the middle. C801 trains have rectangular incandescent headlights as compared to the C801A trains, which have circular, bright white LED headlights.

=== Defects in the C801 rolling stock ===
Minor defects in the C801 rolling stock was made public in a press report made by operator SMRT Trains managing director Lee Ling Wee in 2016, when it was admitted that C801 trains had suffered from cracks. This was after the cracks from the rolling stock C151A trains, which runs on East West line and North South line, were made public on 5 July 2016 which caused a public uproar (See Operational Problems in C151A). According to the press report, the cracks was discovered "during a routine assessment by Bombardier in 2015" and the issue affected all 19 C801 trains. It was stated that 12 of them have fixed locally using wielding methods with remaining 7 waiting for repairs as of time the report was published, having suffered the issue to a lesser degree.

Lee did not reveal what caused the cracks, but a spokesman for Land Transport Authority told Straits Times that the issue is caused by "normal wear and tear" and added that they are not 'safety-critical'. All cracks in APM 100 C801 trains were found on the "lateral beams of the under-frame" and they measured "no more than 12 cm [4.7 in]".

As they are very old, visual defects have been spotted such as peeling paint and windscreen film, and car end windscreen bottom not being attached to the rest of the car. However, no safety-related incidents have occurred. It is also observed that the air-conditioning has degraded or not even functioning at all.

=== Retirement ===
On 7 March 2018, the Land Transport Authority awarded the contract for renewing the Bukit Panjang LRT system to Original Equipment Manufacturer (OEM) Bombardier (Singapore) at a cost of $344 million. Under the contract, all of the 19 C801 trains would be withdrawn from service, and replaced by Bombardier Innovia APM 300R C801B cars. On 26 November 2023, the first C801 train, Car 101, was lifted down from the tracks and sent for scrap. Trains are scrapped locally at Soon Kim Recycling Pte Ltd.

The last day of revenue service for the C801 trains was on 12 September 2025, with cars 102 and 111 making their final runs. The C801 was officially retired on 17 October 2025 with the last remaining car, 102, lifted down from the tracks.

== Livery ==
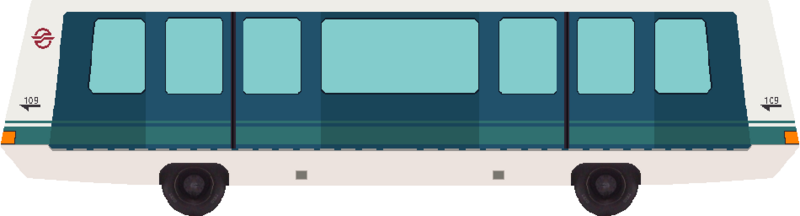
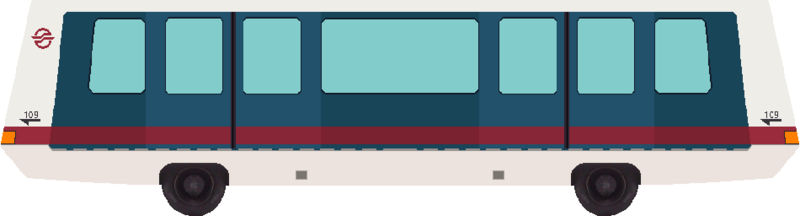

Top: 1st generation livery

Bottom: livery after 2005(2nd livery)

== Train formation ==
The C801 trains predominantly operated as one-car configurations, but due to an increase in demand on the line, since 2019, trains predominantly operated as two-car configurations in revenue service. With each car equipped with both the motors and the third rail current collectors, these trains could run as only one car, but could also be coupled to run as two cars during revenue service. The car numbers of the trains range from 101 to 119. Individual cars are assigned a three-digit serial number by the line's operator, SMRT Trains. A trainset consists of one motor car, e.g. set 101 is car 101. The first digit is always a 1, while the last two digits identify the car number.

- Adtranz built sets 101 – 119.
