= Bombardier Innovia APM 300R C801B =

Class of electric multiple units in Singapore

Alstom Innovia APM 300R C801B
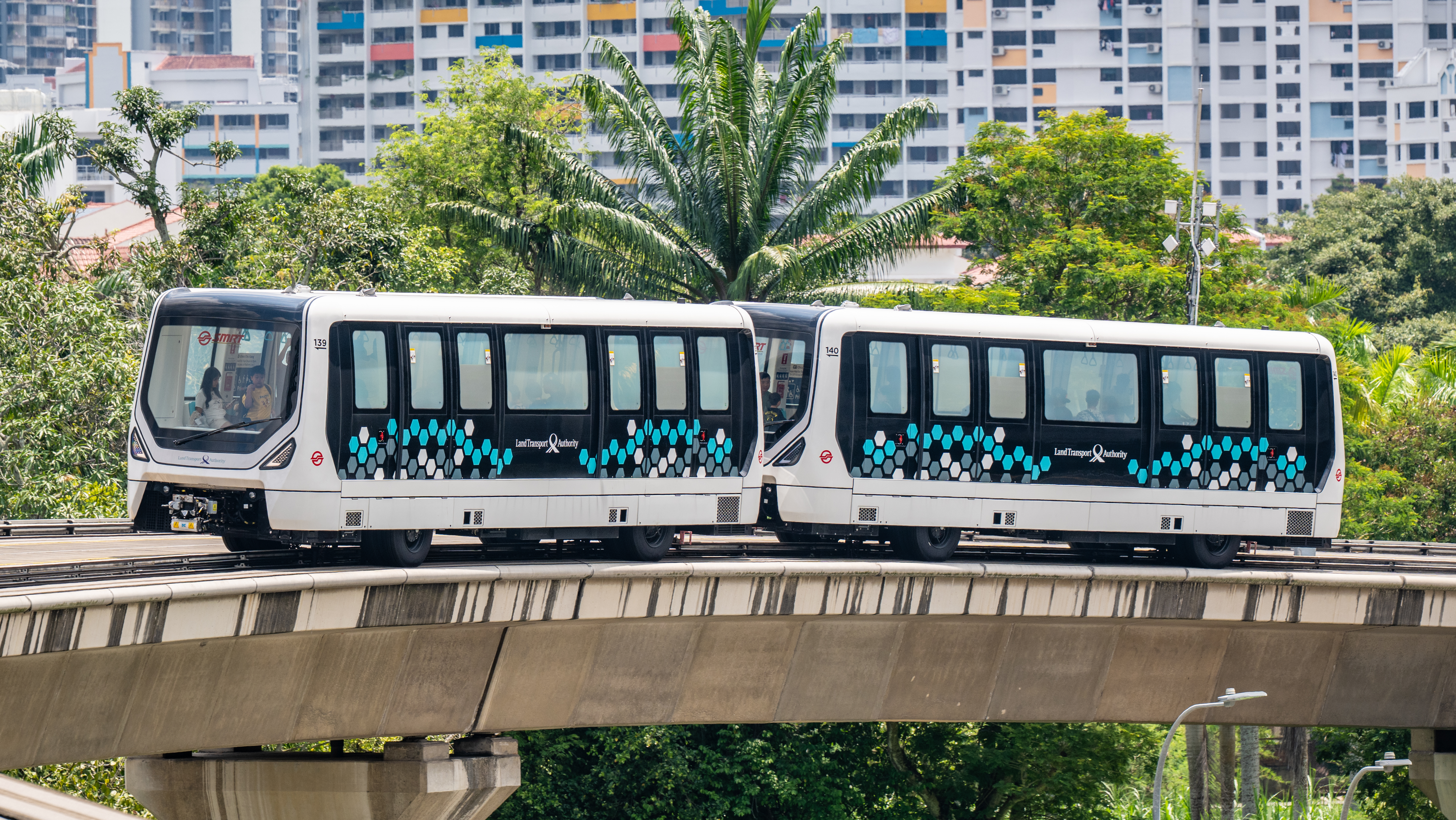
- A C801B two-car set approaching Bukit Panjang LRT station.

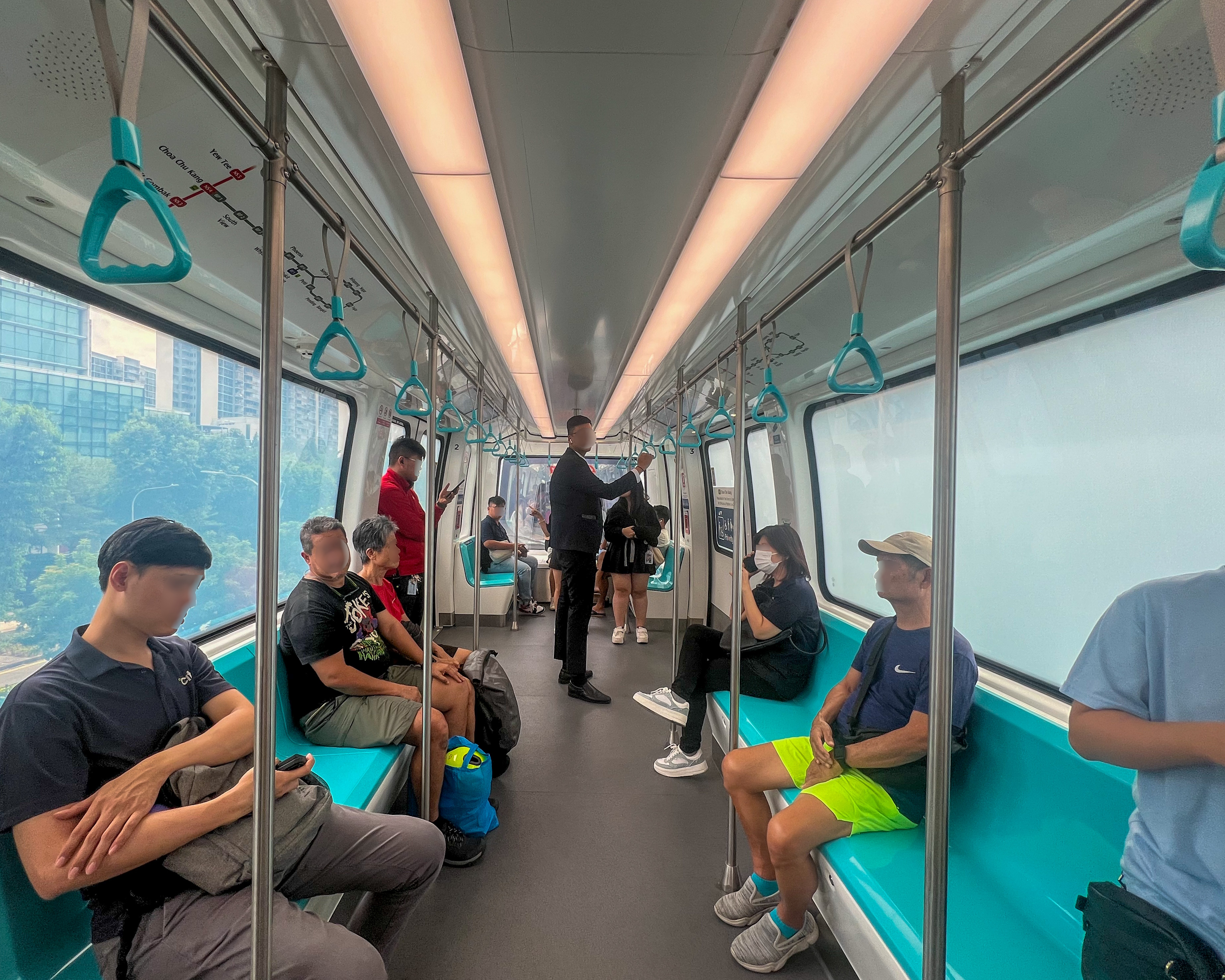
- Interior of a C801B car
- Stock type: Rubber-tyred automated people mover
- In service: 1 August 2024; 2 years ago – present
- Manufacturers: CRRC Nanjing Puzhen Alstom Transportation Systems (Alstom [formerly Bombardier Transportation] and CRRC Nanjing Puzhen Company)
- Built at: Wuhu, Anhui, China
- Family name: Innovia APM
- Replaced: Bombardier Innovia APM 100 C801
- Constructed: 2019 – 2025
- Entered service: 1 August 2024; 2 years ago
- Number built: 19 vehicles
- Number in service: 19 vehicles
- Formation: Single vehicles (M) that can be coupled to form 2-car trains
- Fleet numbers: 133 – 151
- Capacity: 22 seated; 83 standing
- Operator: SMRT Trains Ltd (SMRT Corporation)
- Depot: Ten Mile Junction
- Line served: BPLRT Bukit Panjang LRT line

Specifications
- Car body construction: Aluminum
- Train length: 12.8 m (41 ft 11 7/8 in)
- Car length: 12.8 m (41 ft 11 7/8 in)
- Width: 2.8 m (9 ft 2 1/4 in)
- Height: 3.4 m (11 ft 1 7/8 in)
- Doors: 2 × 2 per car
- Maximum speed: 55 km/h (34 mph) (design); 48 km/h (30 mph) (service)
- Traction system: Alstom MITrac (500 series) IGBT–VVVF
- Acceleration: 0.75m/s^2
- Electric system: 600 V 50 Hz 3-phase AC third rail
- Current collection: Collector shoe
- UIC classification: AA
- Safety systems: Alstom Cityflo 650 moving block CBTC ATC under ATO GoA 4 (UTO), with subsystems of ATP, ATS and CBI
- Coupling system: BSI
- Multiple working: Within type during regular service
- Track gauge: 2,642-millimetre (8 ft 8 in) central guideway with rubber tyres

The Alstom Innovia APM 300R C801B (APM 300R) is the third generation of automated people mover (APM) trains built by a joint venture of Alstom (formerly Bombardier Transportation) and CRRC Nanjing Puzhen Company for the Bukit Panjang LRT line (BPLRT), Singapore, to replace the existing Adtranz ECX-100 C801 trains built in 1999. The C801B trains are also the first of their kind to use AC third rail shoes, in contrast with the newer light rail lines around the world that utilise the APM 300R system built with DC third rail.

== Overview ==
As the aging first-generation C801 trains drew near to its deadline service of 20 years, the LTA decided that the C801 trains were due for replacement instead of a refurbishment. This is in part of their renewal programme for the next 10 years for the BPLRT, including rail replacement and signalling upgrades. The LTA awarded the project to Bombardier Transportation (the manufacturer of the BPLRT train cars at the time, now merged with Alstom) to procure 19 replacement train cars for the BPLRT. However, LTA chose not to reuse the same technology for the train line, instead opting for Bombardier's latest Innovia APM system, the Innovia APM 300. It is said to be much more reliable in many ways, including a much more robust braking and propulsion system, a higher reliability air conditioning system and many more. But with the BPLRT line utilising the same third rail technology as the APM 100, modification works on the APM 300 cars were done to work with AC third rail power supply. Hence, APM 300R was created, specifically for such conditions. The new trains were revealed on 3 December 2019, spotting a sleeker design and enhanced features.

== Revenue service ==
The first two vehicles, cars 135 and 136, entered passenger service on 1 August 2024 as a two-car train coupled together.

== Train formation ==
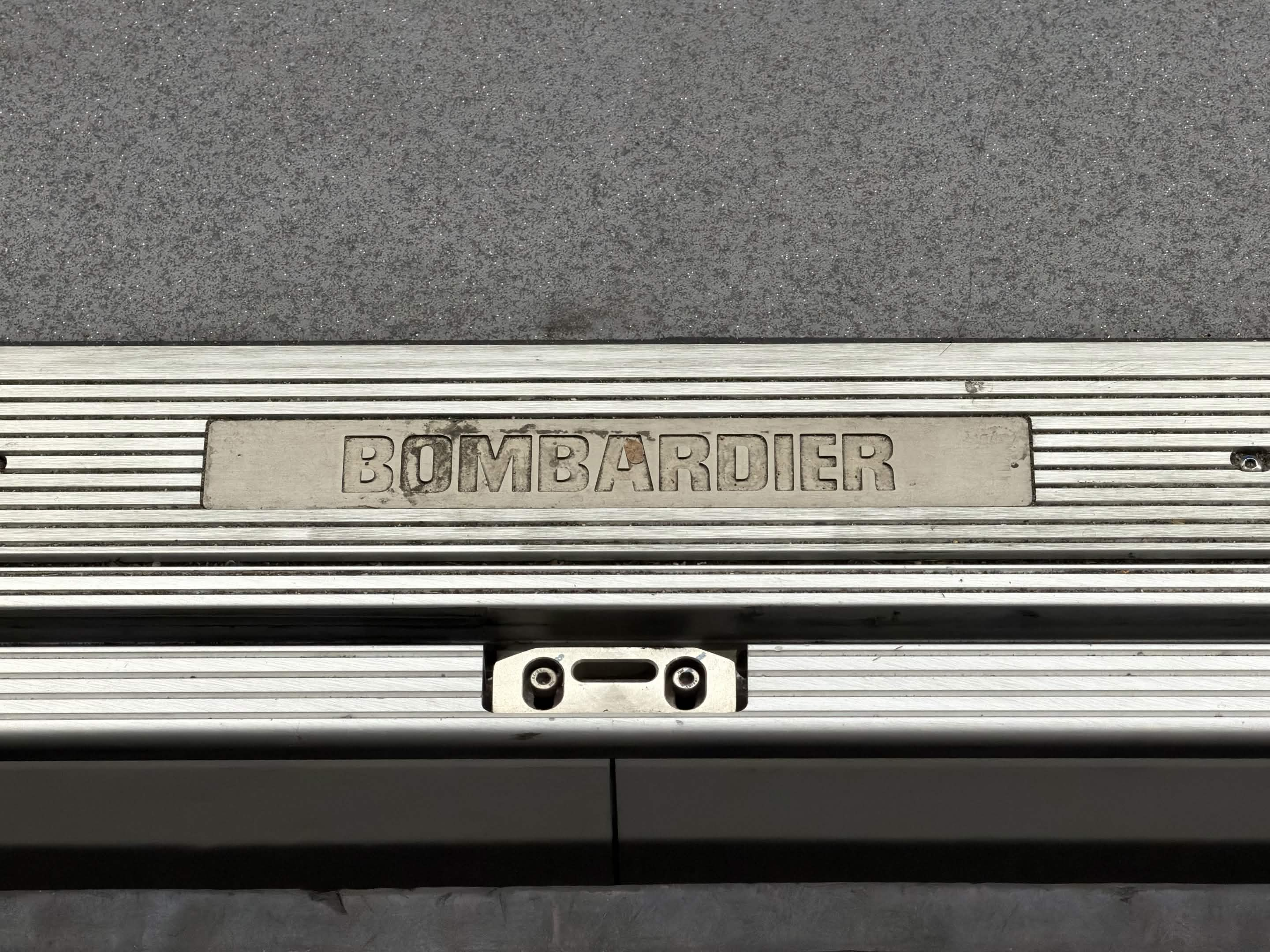
Bombardier builder plate found on 3 out of 19 C801B trains prior to Alstom's acquisition

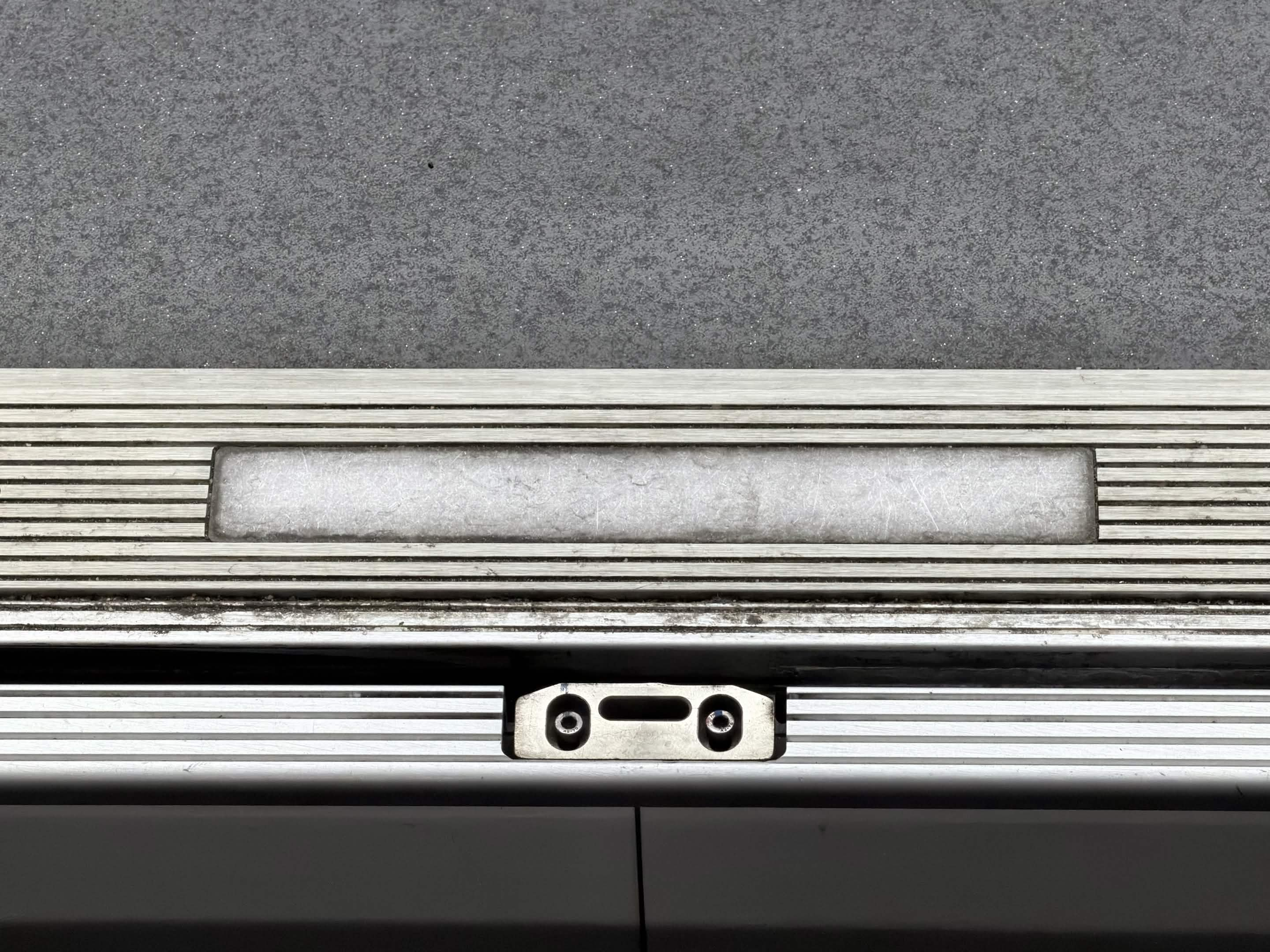
Bombardier builder plate omitted on 16 out of 19 C801B trains after Alstom's acquisition

The C801B trains predominantly operate as two-car configurations in revenue service. With each car equipped with both the motors and the third rail current collectors, these trains can run as only one car, but can also be coupled to run as two cars during revenue service. As the carriages are closed-end, the train must be stationary at an LRT Station and the doors must be open for passengers to move between carriages during 2-car operations.

The car numbers of the trains range from 133 to 151. Individual cars are assigned a three-digit serial number by the line's operator, SMRT Trains. A trainset consists of one motor car, e.g. set 133 is car 133. The first digit is always a 1, while the last two digits identify the car number.

- Bombardier Transportation built sets 133 – 135 prior to Alstom acquisition.
- Alstom built sets 136 – 151.

Note: It is noted that while there was a change in manufacturer, the construction of the vehicle remained the same and in the same factory.

== Pre-operational history ==
The first two train cars, designated 133 & 134, were lifted down from the depot to be sent back to the manufacturing plant in China for modification works. The Land Transport Authority later confirms that the two trains were prototypes used to undertake rigorous testing on the BPLRT network to anticipate potential issues under local operating conditions.
