= Mitsubishi Heavy Industries Crystal Mover C810D =

Class of electric multiple units in Singapore

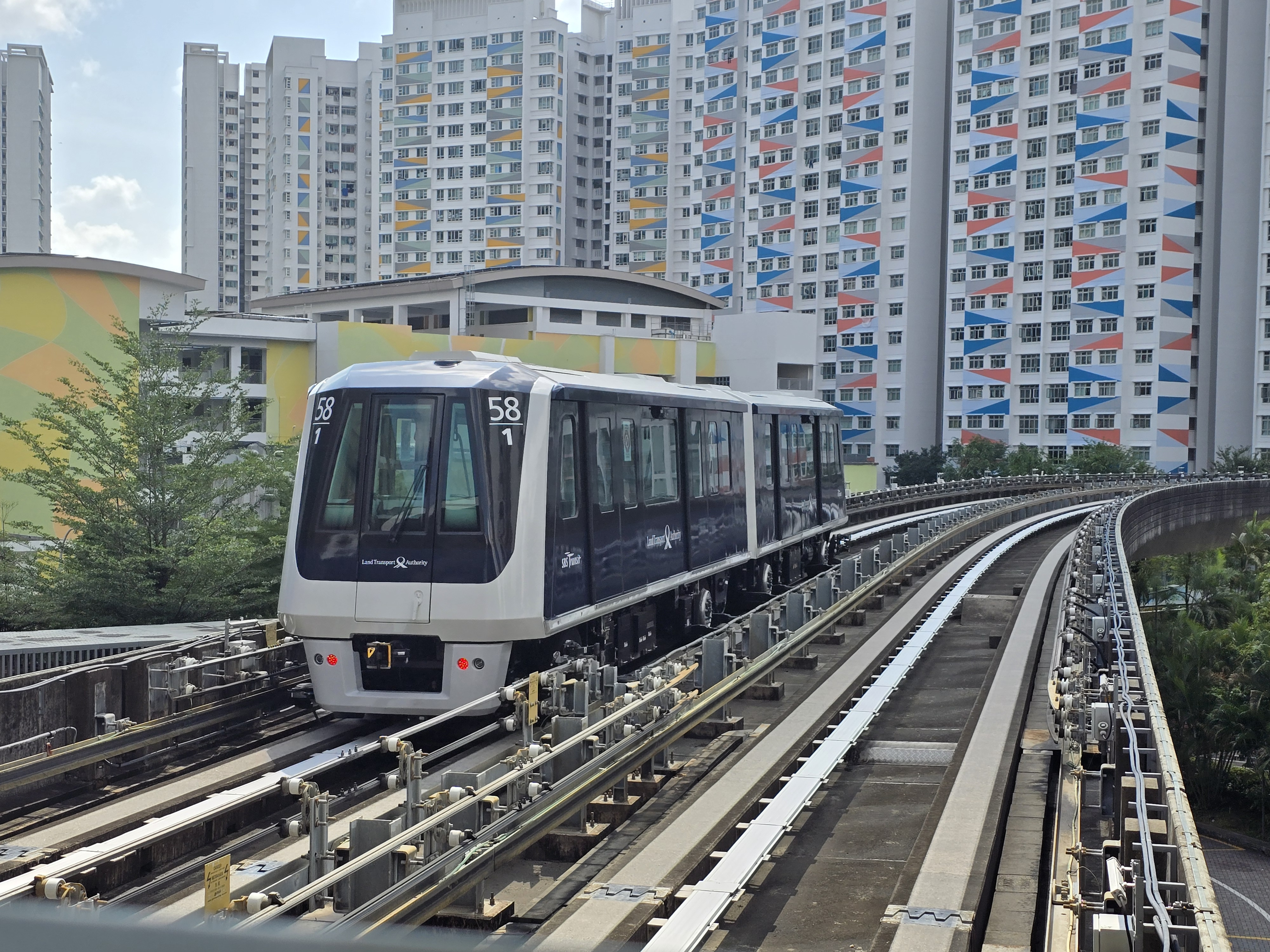
- A C810D departing Fernvale station

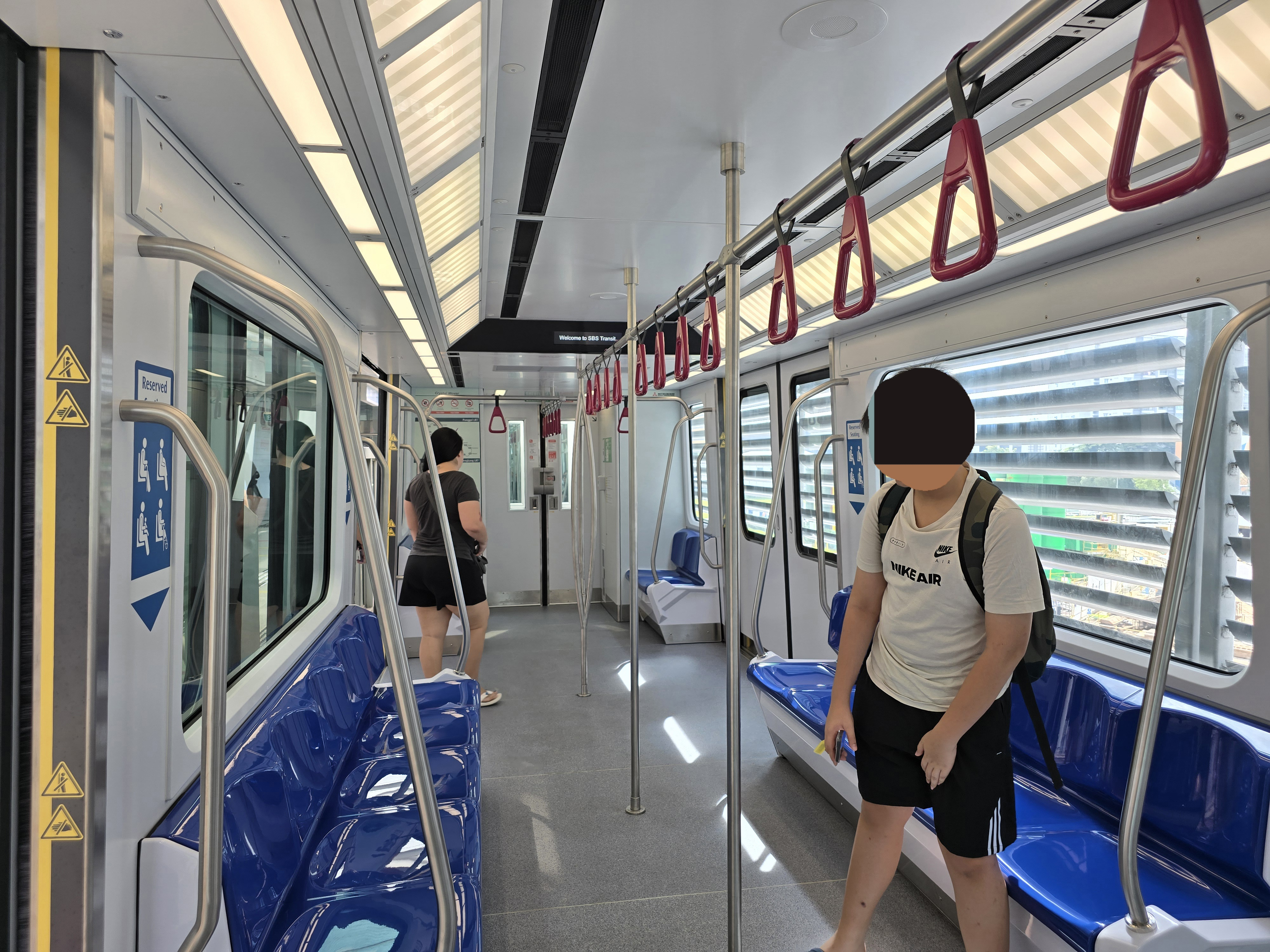
- Interior of C810D
- Stock type: Rubber-tyres automated people mover
- In service: 15 July 2025; 16 months ago - present
- Manufacturer: Mitsubishi Heavy Industries
- Built at: Mihara, Hiroshima, Japan
- Family name: Crystal Mover
- Replaced: Mitsubishi Heavy Industries Crystal Mover C810
- Constructed: 2024 – 2030
- Entered service: 15 July 2025; 16 months ago
- Number under construction: 32 vehicles (16 sets)
- Number built: 34 vehicles (17 sets)
- Number in service: 14 vehicles (7 sets)
- Formation: 2 cars per trainset Mc1–Mc2
- Fleet numbers: 58 – 90
- Capacity: 36 seated; 174 standing
- Operator: SBS Transit Ltd (ComfortDelGro Corporation)
- Depot: Sengkang
- Lines served: SKLRT Sengkang LRT line; PGLRT Punggol LRT line

Specifications
- Car body construction: Aluminum-alloy weighed
- Train length: 23.5 m (77 ft 1 1/4 in)
- Car length: 11.75 m (38 ft 6 5/8 in)
- Width: 2.69 m (8 ft 9 7/8 in)
- Height: 3,615 mm (11 ft 10 3/8 in)
- Doors: 2 × 2 per car
- Maximum speed: 80 km/h (50 mph) (design); 70 km/h (43 mph) (service)
- Weight: 14.9 t (14.7 long tons; 16.4 short tons) per car
- Traction system: Mitsubishi IGBT–VVVF inverter vector control
- Traction motors: 4 × 80 kW (110 hp) 3-phase AC induction motor
- Power output: 320 kW (430 hp)
- Acceleration: 1 m/s^{2} (3.3 ft/s^{2})
- Deceleration: 1 m/s^{2} (3.3 ft/s^{2}) (service); 1.3 m/s^{2} (4.3 ft/s^{2}) (emergency)
- Electric systems: 750 V DC third rail
- Current collection: Collector shoe
- UIC classification: AA+AA
- Braking systems: Electric command pneumatic brake with regenerative brake with stand-by brake, parking brake (with variable load control and wheel slide prevention control)
- Safety systems: Kyosan APM fixed block ATC under ATO GoA 4 (UTO), with subsystems of ATP, ATS and CBI
- Coupling system: Shibata
- Track gauge: 1,850 mm (6 ft 27/32 in); Guideway span: 3.2 m (10 ft 6 in)

The Mitsubishi Heavy Industries Crystal Mover C810D is an automated people mover vehicle which serves the Sengkang LRT line and Punggol LRT line as the third generation train after their previous counterparts Mitsubishi Heavy Industries Crystal Mover C810 and Mitsubishi Heavy Industries Crystal Mover C810A.

== Overview ==
On 5 February 2021, the Land Transport Authority announced that it has purchased 17 two-car trains for the Sengkang and Punggol LRT systems. The new trains will be delivered progressively from 2024 to 2027 to replace the 25 existing one-car C810 trainsets. In addition to new trains, the Sengkang Depot will also be expanded to 11.1 ha (27.4 acres) from the existing 3.5 ha (8.6 acres) to ensure that it has capacity and maintenance space for the new trains. The expansion of the depot will also see two new reception tracks being built to shorten the train launching time. To ensure there is enough electricity to support the larger fleet of trains, 3 new power stations will be built, increasing the total number of power stations supporting the system to 8 once completed. In May 2023, the LTA ordered an additional 8 C810D trains, bringing the total number of C810D trains ordered to 25. These 8 two-car trains will replace all 8 C810 two-car trainsets, while the 8 2-car C810A trainsets will remain in service.

On 23 November 2024, the first batch of 25 new C810D trains has arrived in Singapore and will undergo testing and commissioning works at the Sengkang LRT Depot before entering passenger service by Q3 2025. The first two-car configuration of the 25 C810D trains entered passenger service on 15 July 2025 with the deployment of trainset 59 on the Punggol LRT East Loop, with the remaining 23 trainsets to arrive progressively and enter passenger service from Q3 2025 until end-2028. On 24 January 2026, the C810D made its debut on the Sengkang LRT, with the deployment of trainset 67 on the Sengkang LRT West Loop.

As of February 2026, 7 trains have entered service. It has been announced that the remaining 18 trains will enter service from 2027 onwards, after expansion works at Sengkang Depot have been completed.

On 2 October 2026, apart from announcing the earlier resumption of inner track services along the Sengkang LRT West Loop, LTA announced an additional order of 8 C810D trains to be delivered in 2029 and 2030, bringing the fleet total to 33, and the SPLRT fleet to a grand total of 41.

== Train formation ==
The configuration of a C810D in revenue service is Mc1–Mc2 with both the motors and the third rail current collectors.

The car numbers of the trains range from 58 to 90. Individual cars are assigned a two-digit serial number by the rail operator SBS Transit. A complete two-car trainset consists of two motor cars (Mc1–Mc2).

- Mitsubishi Heavy Industries built sets 58 – 90.
