= Mitsubishi Heavy Industries Crystal Mover C810A =

Class of electric multiple units in Singapore

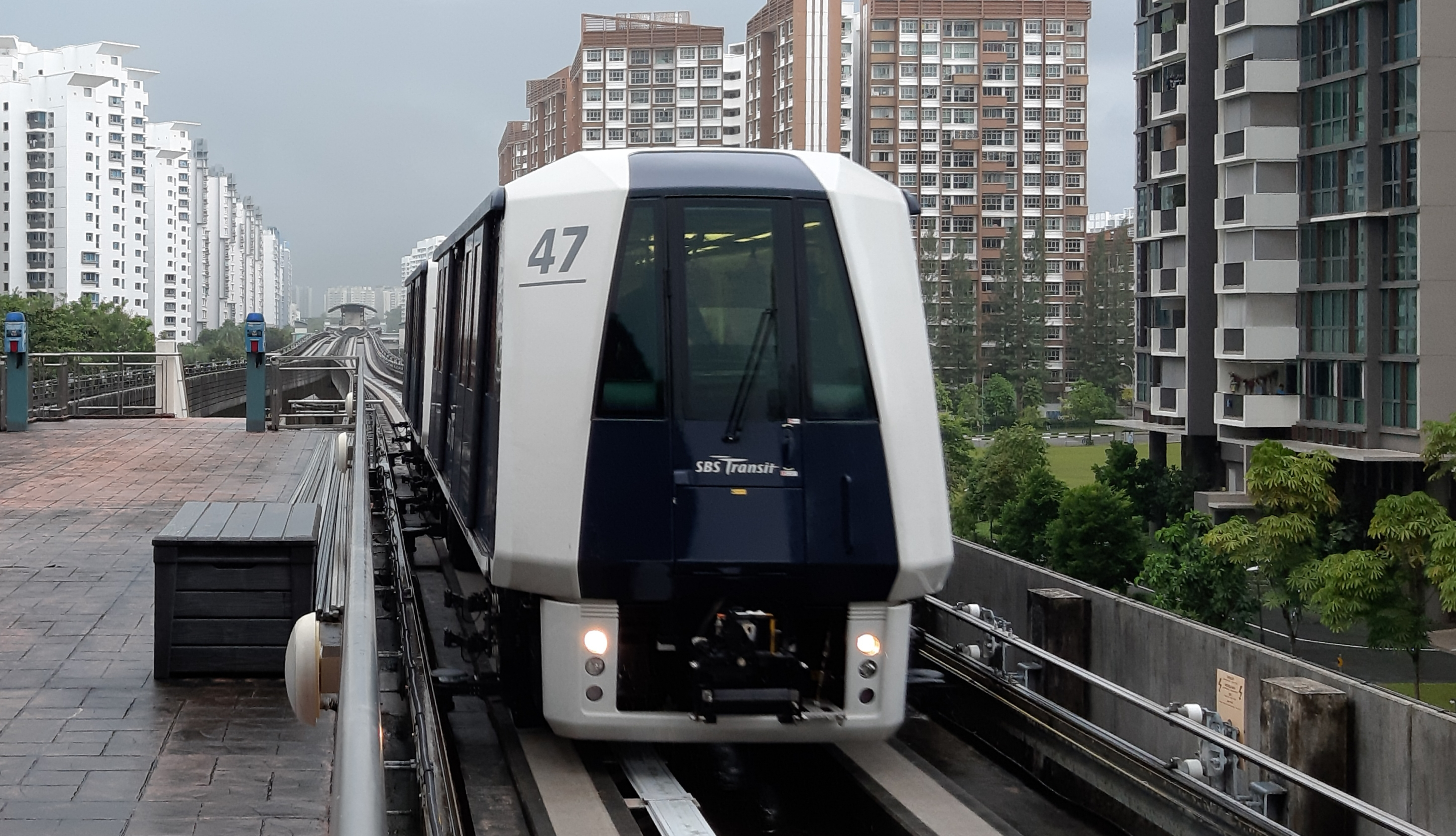
- A Mitsubishi Heavy Industries Crystal Mover C810A train on the Sengkang-Punggol LRT line.

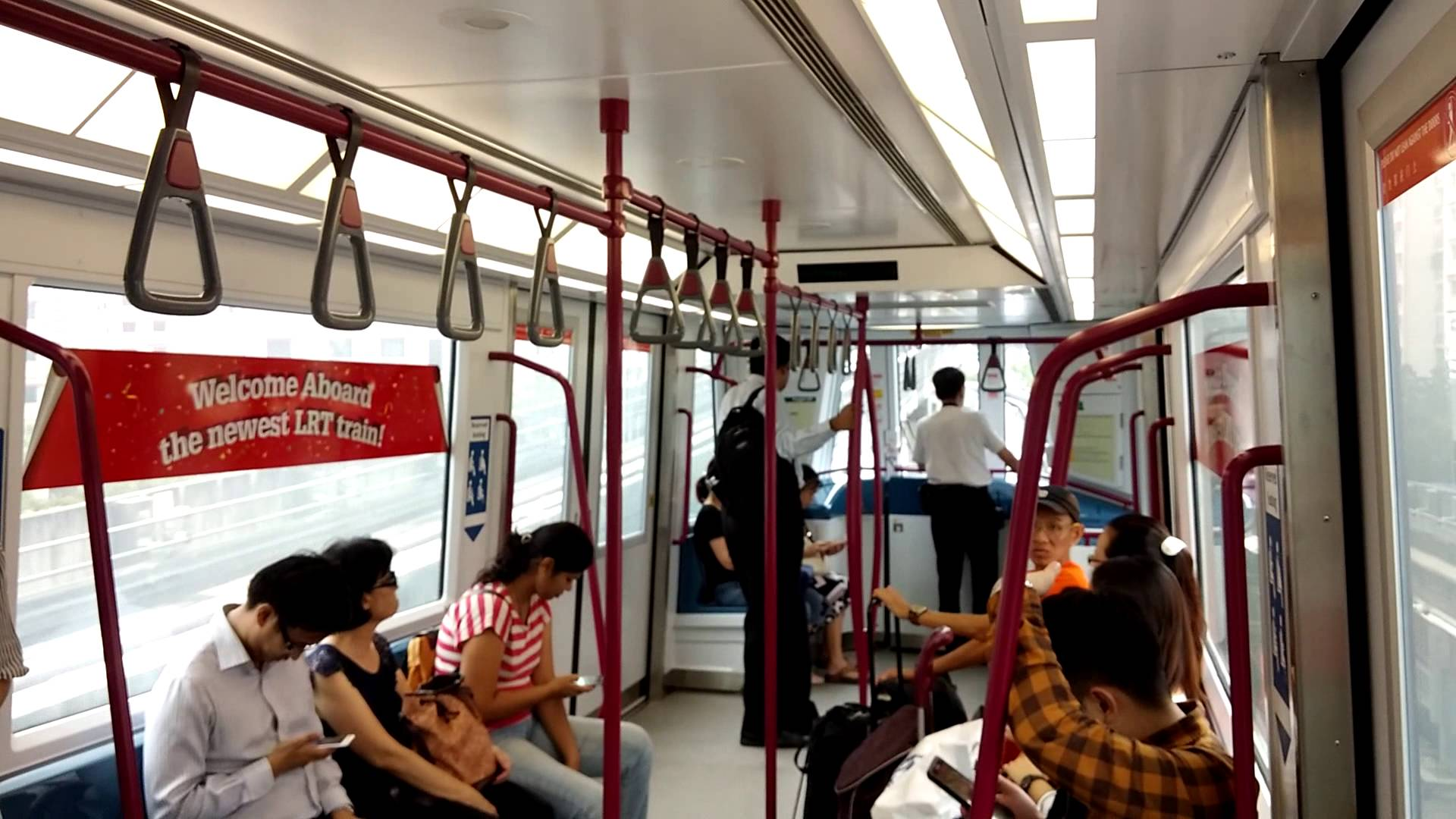
- Interior of C810A train.
- Stock type: Rubber-tyres automated people mover
- In service: 5 April 2016; 10 years ago – Present
- Manufacturer: Mitsubishi Heavy Industries
- Designer: GK Industrial Design
- Built at: Mihara, Hiroshima, Japan
- Family name: Crystal Mover
- Constructed: 2012 – 2016
- Entered service: 5 April 2016; 10 years ago
- Number built: 16 vehicles
- Number in service: 16 vehicles
- Formation: Single vehicles (M) that can be coupled to form 2-car trains
- Fleet numbers: 42 – 57
- Capacity: 14 seated, 91 standing
- Operator: SBS Transit
- Depot: Sengkang
- Lines served: SKLRT Sengkang LRT line; PGLRT Punggol LRT line

Specifications
- Car body construction: Aluminum-alloy weighed
- Train length: 11.84 m (38 ft 10 1/8 in)
- Car length: 11.84 m (38 ft 10 1/8 in)
- Width: 2.69 m (8 ft 9 7/8 in)
- Height: 3,615 mm (11 ft 10 3/8 in)
- Doors: 2 × 2 per car
- Maximum speed: 80 km/h (50 mph) (design); 70 km/h (43 mph) (service)
- Weight: 14.9 t (14.7 long tons; 16.4 short tons) per car
- Traction system: Mitsubishi IGBT–VVVF inverter vector control
- Traction motors: 2 × 80 kW (110 hp) 3-phase AC induction motor
- Power output: 160 kW (210 hp)
- Acceleration: 1 m/s^{2} (2.2 mph/s)
- Deceleration: 1 m/s^{2} (2.2 mph/s) (service); 1.3 m/s^{2} (2.9 mph/s) (emergency)
- Electric systems: 750 V DC third rail
- Current collection: Collector shoe
- UIC classification: AA
- Braking systems: Electric command pneumatic brake with regenerative brake with stand-by brake, parking brake (with variable load control and wheel slide prevention control)
- Safety systems: Kyosan APM fixed block ATC under ATO GoA 4 (UTO), with subsystems of ATP, ATS and CBI
- Coupling system: Faiveley
- Multiple working: Within and between type
- Track gauge: 1,850 mm (6 ft 27/32 in); Guideway span: 3.2 m (10 ft 6 in)

The Mitsubishi Heavy Industries Crystal Mover C810A is an automated people mover vehicle which serves the Sengkang LRT line and Punggol LRT line as the second generation train after their previous counterparts Mitsubishi Heavy Industries Crystal Mover C810.

The C810A trains were developed and built by Mitsubishi Heavy Industries in cooperation with Crystal Mover Bodywork, the same company that developed the newer Changi Airport Skytrain. The trains were developed for airport and light rail applications. They are fully automated and driverless, relying on Automatic Train Control (ATC) technology.

== Overview ==
On 22 May 2013, the Land Transport Authority announced the purchase of 16 new train cars to boost the capacity of the Sengkang and Punggol LRT systems by approximately 40% during peak hours. All C810A trains were built to specification & bodywork with same as the C810 trains, and the first two trains entered passenger service on 5 April 2016.

== Operational issues ==
On 9 September 2016, SBS Transit as the operator of Sengkang LRT line and Punggol LRT line has announced that 11 of the 41 C810 trains had hairline cracks.

This is barely 2 months after the announcements that the cracks were found in C151A trains which run on both East West MRT line as well as North South MRT line and subsequently C801 trains which run on Bukit Panjang LRT line.

Similar to previous incidents, the joint statement by the SBS Transit and Land Transport Authority said that the cracks were found on the undercarriage of the trains and assure that this does not compromise their ability to bear passenger weight.

SBS Transit has withdrawn affected trains while waiting for the bogie frames found in the undercarriage to be replaced as a precautionary measure. In the report, SBS Transit has said that six of the 11 trains have the issue rectified and resumed their operational duties since while the remaining 5 would be rectified by the middle of next month.

At the same time, the affected bogie frame was sent to Mitsubishi Heavy Industries in Japan for detailed analysis in order to establish the root cause.

The joint statement also said that both LTA and SBS Transit, as well as the manufacturer, will redesign and strengthen the bogie frame structures, which will be applied to all 57 trains including the newer C810A trains. The manufacturer is expected to bear the full cost as well.
