= Mitsubishi Heavy Industries Crystal Mover C810 =

Class of electric multiple units in Singapore

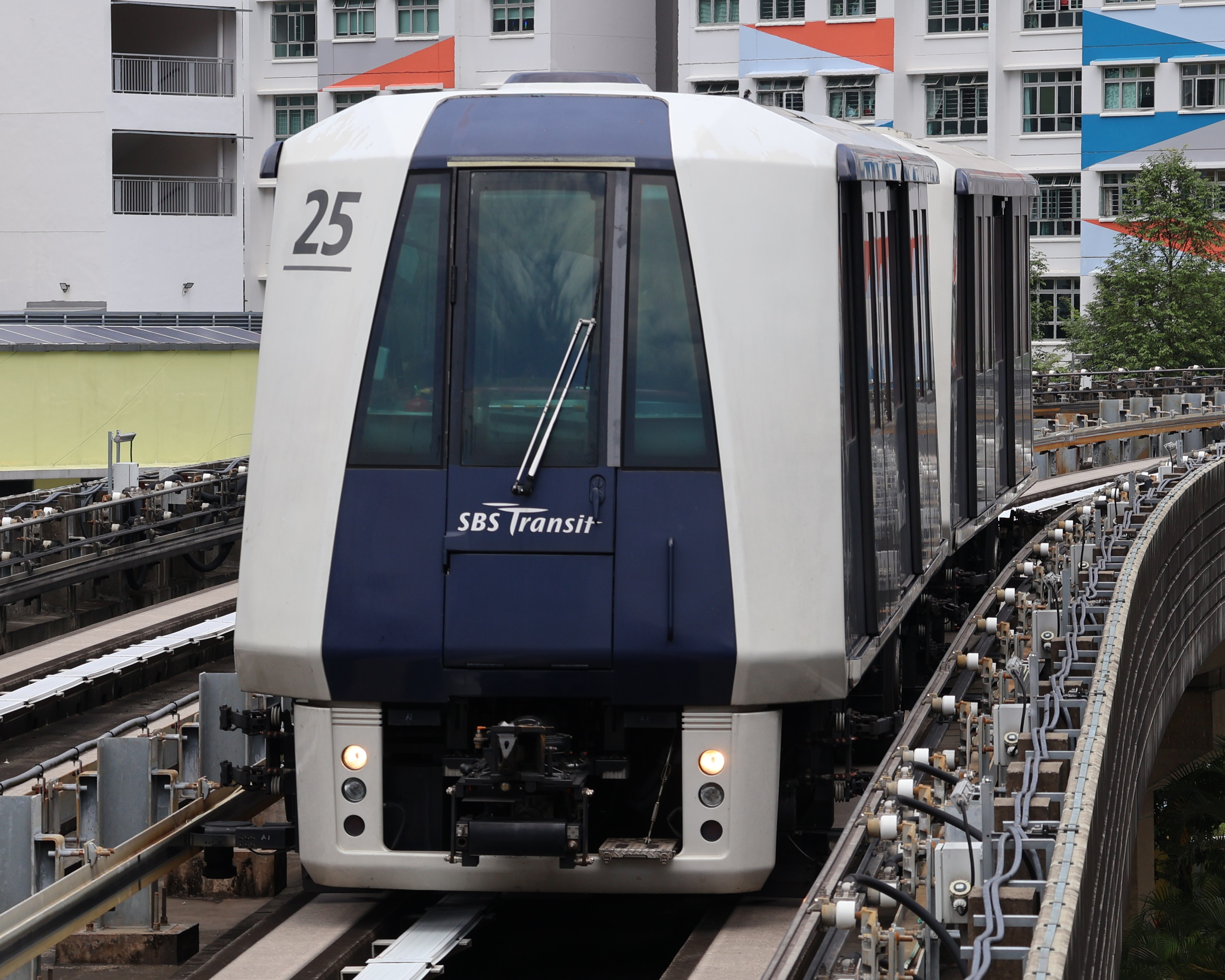
- A Mitsubishi Heavy Industries Crystal Mover C810 train with the original coupler design on the Sengkang-Punggol LRT line. A Mitsubishi Heavy Industries Crystal Mover C810 train with a modified coupler design for multiple working on the Sengkang-Punggol LRT line.

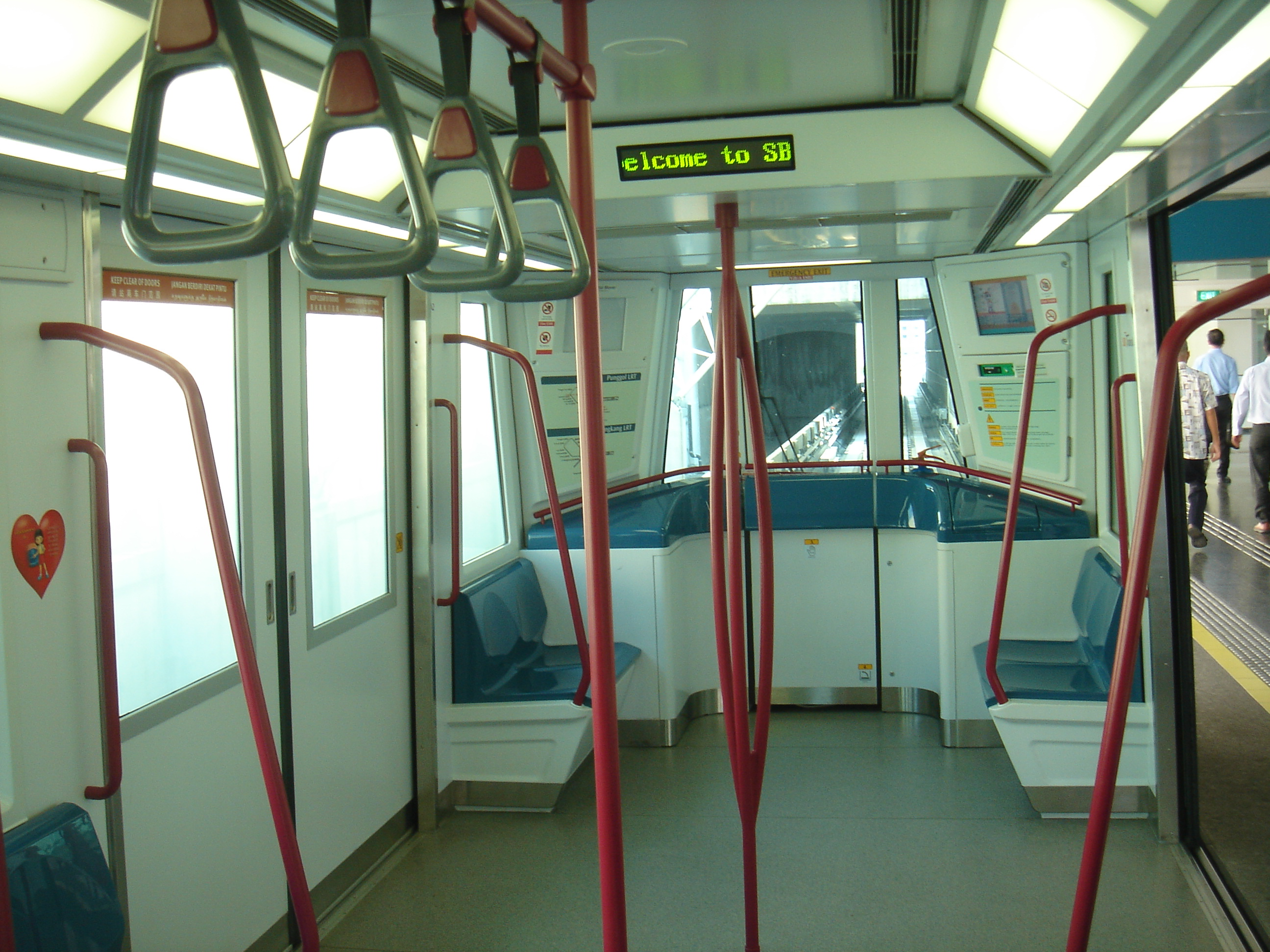
- Interior of C810 train.
- Stock type: Rubber-tyres automated people mover
- In service: 18 January 2003; 23 years ago – Present
- Manufacturer: Mitsubishi Heavy Industries
- Designer: GK Industrial Design
- Built at: Mihara, Hiroshima, Japan
- Family name: Crystal Mover
- Constructed: 2000 – 2003
- Entered service: 18 January 2003; 23 years ago
- Number built: 41 vehicles
- Number in service: 33 vehicles (17 unmodified, 16 modified)
- Number scrapped: 5 vehicles
- Successor: Mitsubishi Heavy Industries Crystal Mover C810D
- Formation: Single vehicles (M) that can be coupled to form 2-car trains
- Fleet numbers: 01 – 41
- Capacity: 18 seated, 87 standing (C810 as built); 14 seated, 91 standing (modified C810 (Note: V04, V05, V07, V09, V10, V12, V15, V18, V22, V25, V27, V28, V30, V33, V35, and V36 only.))
- Operator: SBS Transit
- Depot: Sengkang
- Lines served: SKLRT Sengkang LRT line; PGLRT Punggol LRT line

Specifications
- Car body construction: Aluminum-alloy weighed
- Train length: 11.84 m (38 ft 10 1/8 in)
- Car length: 11.84 m (38 ft 10 1/8 in)
- Width: 2.69 m (8 ft 9 7/8 in)
- Height: 3,615 mm (11 ft 10 3/8 in)
- Doors: 2 × 2 per car
- Maximum speed: 80 km/h (50 mph) (design); 70 km/h (43 mph) (service)
- Weight: 14.9 t (14.7 long tons; 16.4 short tons) per car
- Traction system: Mitsubishi IGBT–VVVF inverter vector control
- Traction motors: 2 × 80 kW (110 hp) 3-phase AC induction motor
- Power output: 160 kW (210 hp)
- Acceleration: 1 m/s^{2} (2.2 mph/s)
- Deceleration: 1 m/s^{2} (2.2 mph/s) (service); 1.3 m/s^{2} (2.9 mph/s) (emergency)
- Electric systems: 750 V DC third rail
- Current collection: Collector shoe
- UIC classification: AA
- Braking systems: Electric command pneumatic brake with regenerative brake with stand-by brake, parking brake (with variable load control and wheel slide prevention control)
- Safety systems: Kyosan APM fixed block ATC under ATO GoA 4 (UTO), with subsystems of ATP, ATS and CBI
- Coupling system: Shibata (C810 as built); Faiveley (C810 modification train coupler multiple working repowered by C810A)
- Multiple working: Within and between type
- Track gauge: 1,850 mm (6 ft 27/32 in); Guideway span: 3.2 m (10 ft 6 in)

The Mitsubishi Heavy Industries Crystal Mover C810 is an automated people mover vehicle which serves the Sengkang LRT line and Punggol LRT line as the first generation train that has been operating since 18 January 2003, with its first service on the Sengkang East Loop.

The C810 trains were developed and built by Mitsubishi Heavy Industries in cooperation with Crystal Mover Bodywork, the same company that developed the newer Changi Airport Skytrain. The trains were developed for airport and light rail applications. They are fully automated and driverless, relying on Automatic Train Control (ATC) technology.

Singapore's Light Rail Transit purchased 41 C810 trains to be used on the Sengkang LRT line and Punggol LRT line. Between 2013 and 2015, 16 of these trains underwent modifications to support two-car formations, significantly increasing the system's capacity.

The C810D vehicles are expected to replace all of the first generation C810 vehicles by 2028. Following the withdrawal of the C801 on the Bukit Panjang LRT, the C810 is currently the oldest LRT rolling stock in Singapore.

== Train design ==
The C810 trains feature a distinctive dual-color livery of indigo and white, prominently displaying the SBS Transit logo in white. For easy identification, serial numbers are located on the far right of the train's front and rear sections. Notably, both the windshield wipers and emergency exit doors were custom-engineered specifically for the requirements of the LRT system.

Inside the Sengkang and Punggol LRT carriages, the color palette consists of indigo seating complemented by bright red grab poles. 16 of the C810 trains that underwent modification have two seats in the front and back converted into perch seats, thus reducing the number of seats to 14 from the usual 18 seats.

Because the carriages are designed with closed ends due to the lack of gangway connections, passengers cannot move between cars while the train is in motion. During two-car operations, commuters may only switch carriages while the train is stationary at a station with the doors fully deployed.

== Train formation ==
The configuration of a C810 in revenue service is just the one car. With both the motors and the third rail current collectors, the train cars can be coupled up to 2 cars during service.

The car numbers of the C810 trains range from 01 to 41. Individual cars are assigned a two-digit serial number by the rail operator SBS Transit. A trainset consists of one motor car, e.g. set 01 is car 01. Both digits identify the car number.

- Mitsubishi Heavy Industries built sets 01 – 41.

The modified C810 trains have underlined serial numbers on their exterior, indicating they have couplers that allow them to be operated in 2-car formations.

== Operational issues ==
On 9 September 2016, SBS Transit as the operator of Sengkang LRT line and Punggol LRT line has announced that 11 of the 41 C810 trains had hairline cracks.

This is barely 2 months after the announcements that the cracks were found in C151A trains which run on both East West MRT line as well as North South MRT line and subsequently C801 trains which run on Bukit Panjang LRT line.

Similar to previous incidents, the joint statement by the SBS Transit and Land Transport Authority said that the cracks were found on the undercarriage of the trains and assure that this does not compromise their ability to bear passenger weight.

SBS Transit has withdrawn affected trains while waiting for the bogie frames found in the undercarriage to be replaced as a precautionary measure. In the report, SBS Transit has said that six of the 11 trains have the issue rectified and resumed their operational duties since while the remaining 5 would be rectified by the middle of next month.

At the same time, the affected bogie frame was sent to Mitsubishi Heavy Industries in Japan for detailed analysis in order to establish the root cause.

The joint statement also said that both LTA and SBS Transit, as well as the manufacturer, will redesign and strengthen the bogie frame structures, which will be applied to all 57 trains including the newer C810A trains. The manufacturer is expected to bear the full cost as well.

== Replacement ==
On 5 February 2021, the Land Transport Authority announced that it has purchased 17 two-car C810D trains for the Sengkang and Punggol LRT systems, which will replace the 25 existing unmodified C810 trains. In May 2023, the LTA ordered an additional 8 C810D trains, bringing the total number of C810D trains ordered to 25. In October 2026, LTA ordered a further 8 C810D trains. These 8 two-car trains will replace the 16 modified C810 trains, while the remaining 16 C810A trains will remain in service, bringing the total fleet to 41 two-car trains. On 27 September 2025, the first C810 train (car 01) was sent for scrap and as of July 2026, 7 C810 trains have been decommissioned, with 34 remaining in active service. V01, V23, V26, V31 and V34 have been scrapped while V13 and V21 are being used as test trains for the expanded Sengkang LRT Depot.
