= Crystal Mover =

Rubber-tired automated people mover system manufactured by Mitsubishi Heavy Industries

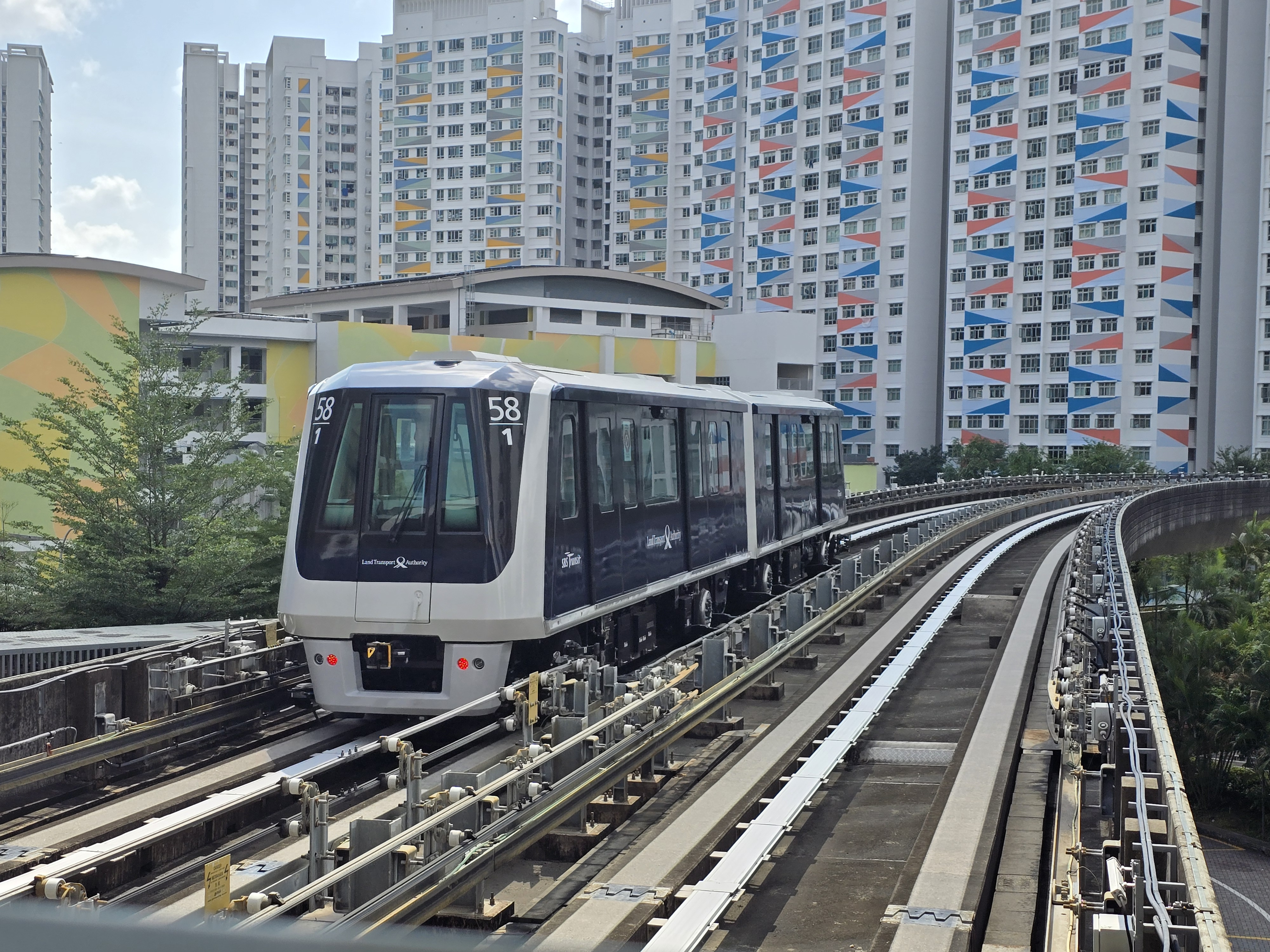
A Crystal Mover (C810D) testing on the Sengkang LRT line

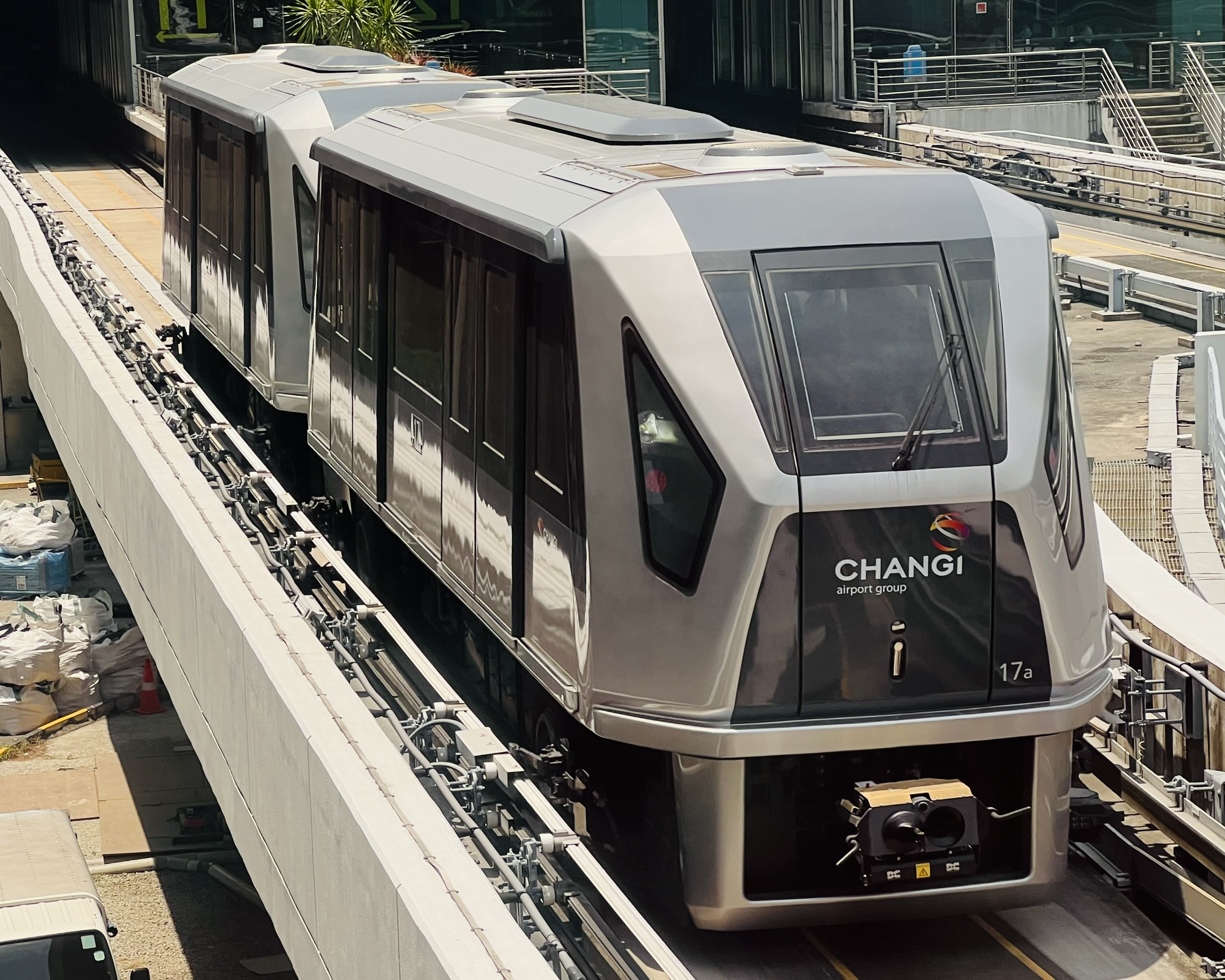
Skytrain departing Terminal 3 station at Singapore Changi Airport

The Crystal Mover is a rubber-tired automated people mover (APM) system for airport and urban rail transit applications manufactured at Mitsubishi Heavy Industries (MHI) Mihara Machinery Works in Mihara, Hiroshima Prefecture, Japan. The Crystal Mover, initially based on the Japanese APM standard, is used in automated guideway transit (AGT) systems in China, Japan, Singapore, South Korea, the United Arab Emirates and the United States.

Since 2010s, MHI has been building and delivering a new family of AGT systems branded Urbanismo as the successor to the Crystal Mover. The Urbanismo family consists of a higher-speed model called "Urbanismo Super AGT" with a top speed of 120 km/h and three customizable models called "Urbanismo-22", "Urbanismo-18", and "Urbanismo-16" with a gross weight of over 22, 18, and 16 tonnes, respectively.

== Urban rail systems ==
=== Japan ===
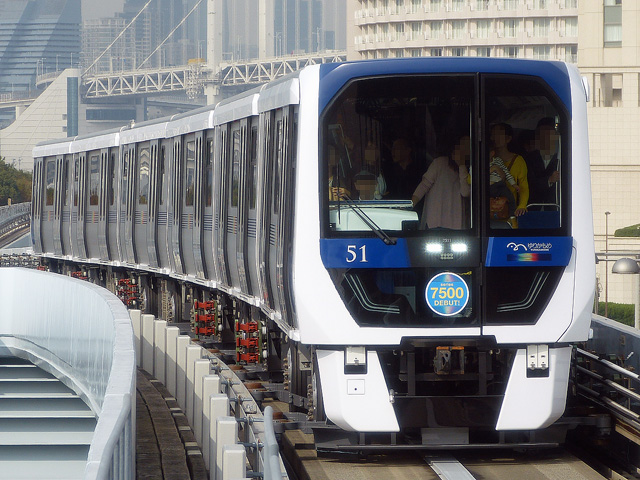
Yurikamome 7500 series EMU based on the Urbanismo-18 class (November 2018)

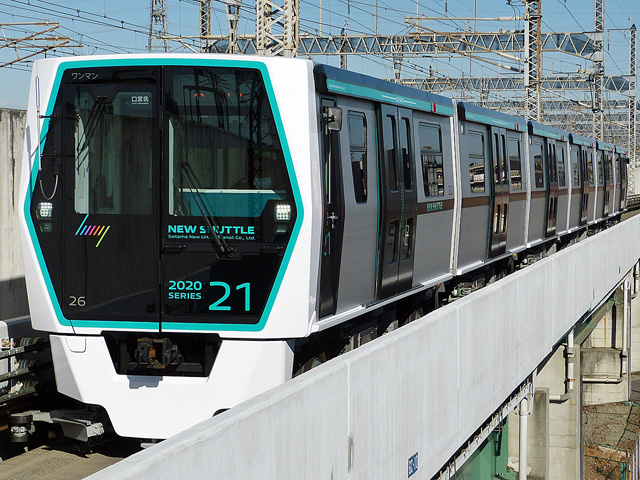
New Shuttle 2020 series EMU based on the Urbanismo-16 class (February 2016)

Between 2014 and 2016, Yurikamome, Inc., which operates the Yurikamome line in Tokyo, purchased a fleet of 18 six-car 7300 series trainsets based on the Urbanismo-18 class to replace all of the 18 six-car 7000 series trainsets. Between June 2018 and June 2020, MHI also delivered 8 six-car 7500 series (upgraded version of 7300 series) trainsets to replace the fleet of 7200 series trainsets.

Saitama New Urban Transit Co., Ltd., which operates the New Shuttle in Saitama Prefecture, purchased a fleet of 5 six-car 2020 series trainsets based on the Urbanismo-16 class to replace the fleet of 3 six-car 1010 series trainsets and 2 six-car 1050 series trainsets from 2015 to 2020.

In Hiroshima, Hiroshima Rapid Transit purchased 24 six-car 7000 series trainsets based on the Urbanismo class to replace the existing fleet of 23 six-car 6000 series trainsets and 1 six-car 1000 series trainset running on the Astram Line. The 7000 series entered service on 26 March 2020.

The Tokyo Metropolitan Bureau of Transportation purchased a fleet of 12 five-car 330 series trainsets, which are similar in design to the Yurikamome 7300 series trainsets, to replace the fleet of 300 series trainsets running on the Nippori-Toneri Liner from fiscal 2022 to 2024.

On 22 January 2025, MHI received an order from Seibu Railway for 3 four-car trainsets to replace the Seibu 8500 series. Designated as the Seibu L00 series, the first of these sets is expected to enter service on the Seibu Yamaguchi Line in March 2026, boosting capacity to carry passengers to two leisure facilities operated by the Seibu Group: Belluna Dome and Seibu Amusement Park.

=== Singapore ===
In Singapore, Crystal Movers operate on the Sengkang LRT line and the Punggol LRT line, both managed by SBS Transit Ltd. These cars have been operating since 2003 on the Sengkang LRT and on the Punggol LRT since its opening in 2005. There is a fleet of 41 cars of Mitsubishi Crystal Mover Contract 810 in total for the two LRT lines. An additional order was placed for 16 more cars under Contract 810A with identical specifications to increase capacity on both LRT lines, with all trains delivered by 2016.

On 5 February 2021, the Land Transport Authority (LTA) announced that it has purchased 17 two-car C810D trains for the Sengkang and Punggol LRT systems, which will replace the 25 existing one-car C810 trains. In May 2023, the LTA ordered an additional 8 C810D trains, which will replace the 8 existing two-car C810 trains. This brings the total number of C810D trains ordered to 25, and the total fleet to 33 trains, comprised two-car C810A and C810D trainsets. The first C810D train arrived in Singapore on 23 November 2024 and entered passenger service on 15 July 2025, while the remaining 23 trainsets will arrive progressively and enter passenger service from Q3 2025 until the end of 2028. All trains will undergo testing and commissioning works before entering passenger service.

=== Macau ===
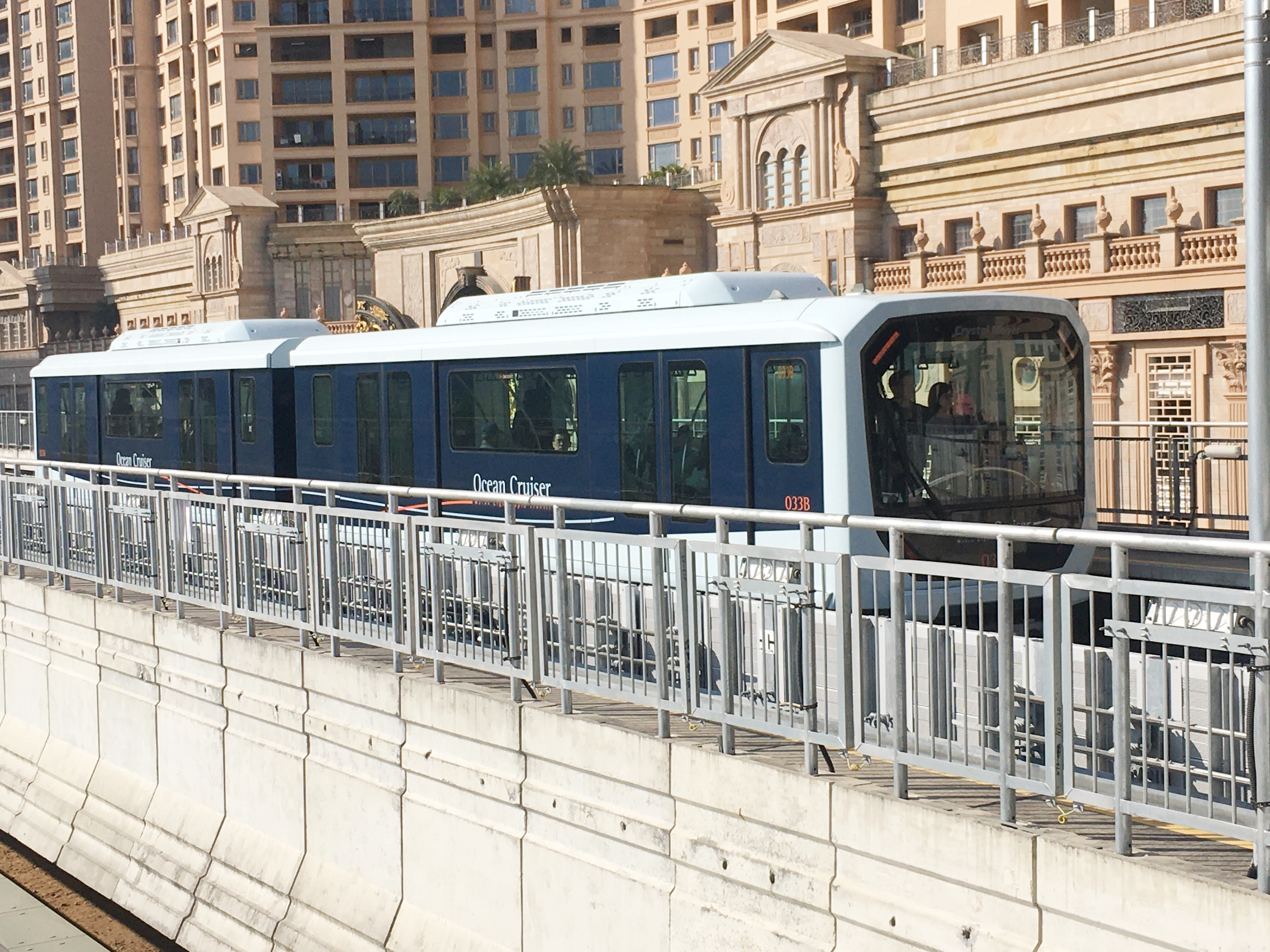
Urbanismo-22 vehicles operating on the Macau light rail system opened in 2019

On 31 December 2010, Macau placed a MOP 4.688 billion order for Urbanismo-22 vehicles nicknamed "Ocean Cruiser" for the Macau Light Transit System, which started commercial operation on 10 December 2019. It was free of charge until 31 January 2020.

== Airport connections ==
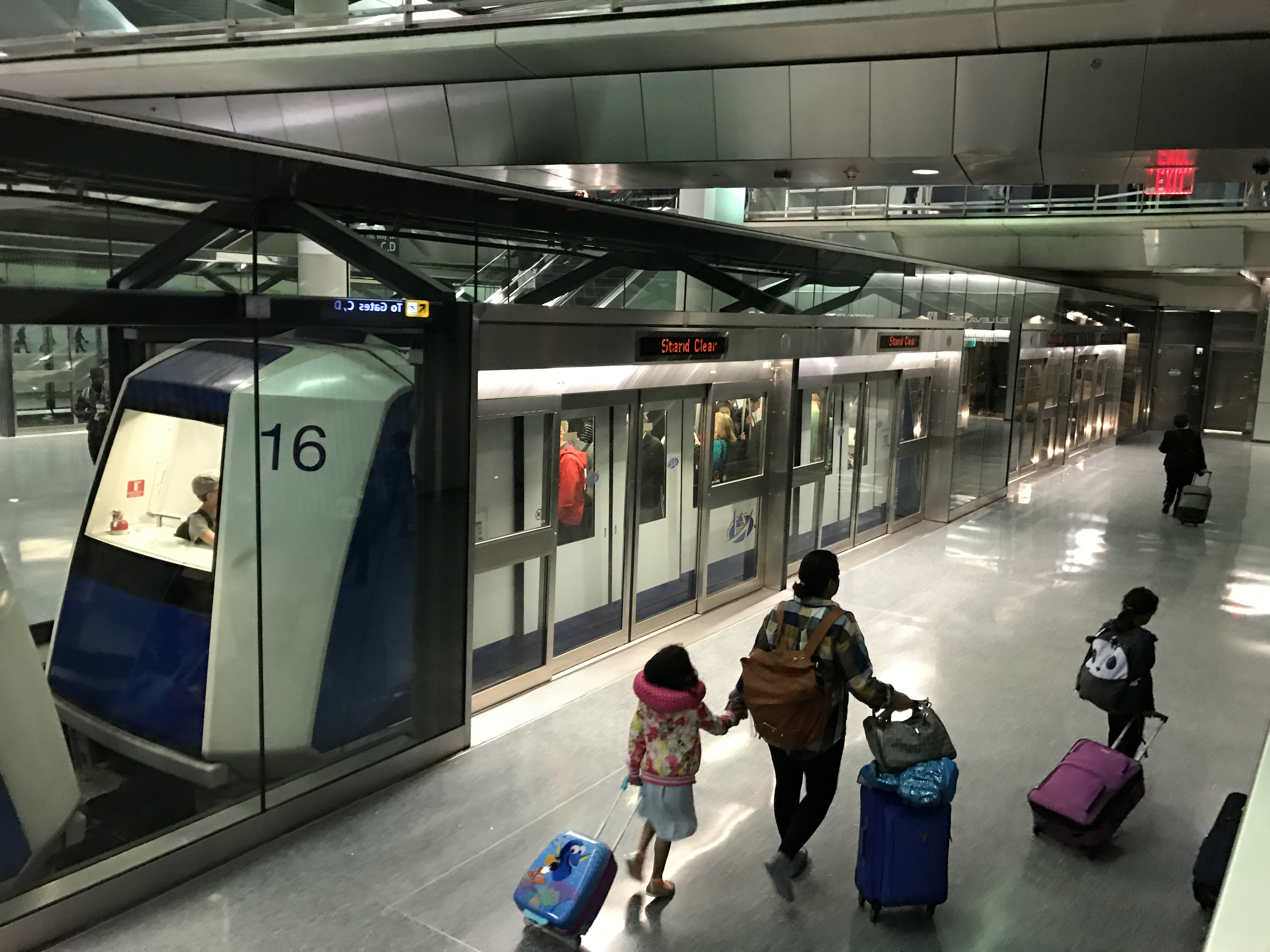
AeroTrain at the Washington Dulles International Airport is a Crystal Mover system.

Crystal Movers are currently in operation in the following airports, with most applications being in the United States:

=== Hong Kong ===
- HKIA Automated People Mover, Hong Kong International Airport

=== Singapore ===
- Changi Airport Skytrain, Singapore Changi Airport

=== South Korea ===
- Incheon Airport Shuttle Train, Incheon International Airport

=== United Arab Emirates ===
- Dubai International Airport Terminal 3 APM, Dubai International Airport, UAE

=== United States ===
- AeroTrain, Dulles International Airport, United States
- ATL Skytrain, Hartsfield-Jackson Atlanta International Airport, United States
- MIA Mover and Skytrain, Miami International Airport, United States
- Orlando International Airport People Movers, Orlando International Airport, United States (Note: C parking terminal and gates 1-59 only, gates 70-129 are served by Bombardier CX-100 shuttles.)
- SkyConnect, Tampa International Airport, United States

== Specifications ==
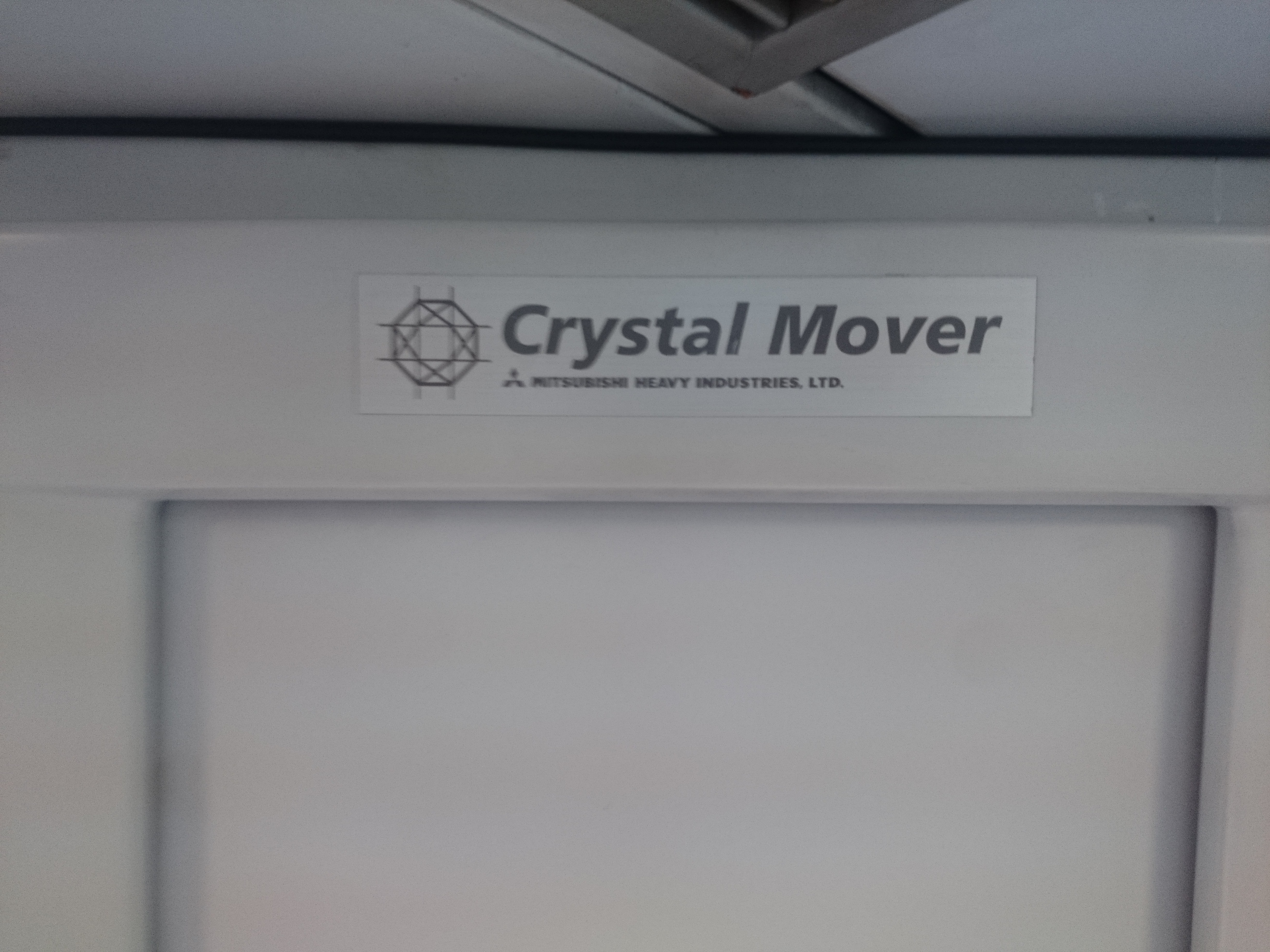
Logo of Crystal Mover

=== Original C810 ===
The specifications of an example configuration of the original Crystal Mover were given as:

- Configuration: Single- or double-car
- Capacity (passengers): 105 (including 18 seats) or 210 (including 36 seats)
- Vehicle mass: 14.9 t (14.7 long tons; 16.4 short tons) per vehicle
- Vehicle dimensions (L × W × H): 11.20 m × 2.69 m × 3.615 m (36 ft 8.9 in × 8 ft 9.9 in × 11 ft 10.3 in)
- Guide system: Side guide two-axis four-wheel steering system
- Electric system: Third rail at 750 volts direct current
- Gauge: 1,850 mm (6 ft 27/32 in); guide rail span: 3.2 m (10 ft 6 in)
- Maximum speed:
  - Design: 80 km/h (50 mph)
  - Operation: 70 km/h (43 mph)
- Service acceleration and braking: 1.0 m/s^{2} (3.3 ft/s^{2}; 3.6 km/(h⋅s))
- Emergency braking: 1.3 m/s^{2} (4.3 ft/s^{2}; 4.7 km/(h⋅s))
- Car body structure: Aluminum alloy welded structure
- Traction motor: Two 3-phase alternating current induction motors each with a continuous rating of 80 kW (110 hp)
- Propulsion control system: IGBT–VVVF inverter vector control (individual control of each axis with variable load control)
- Brake system: Electric command pneumatic brake with regenerative brake (with stand-by brake, parking brake, variable load control and wheel slide prevention control)

== See also ==
- Automated guideway transit
- Rubber-tyred tram and Rubber-tyred metro

Competing systems:

- Bombardier Innovia APM
- Véhicule Automatique Léger (VAL)
