= Sengkang Depot =

Train depot in Singapore

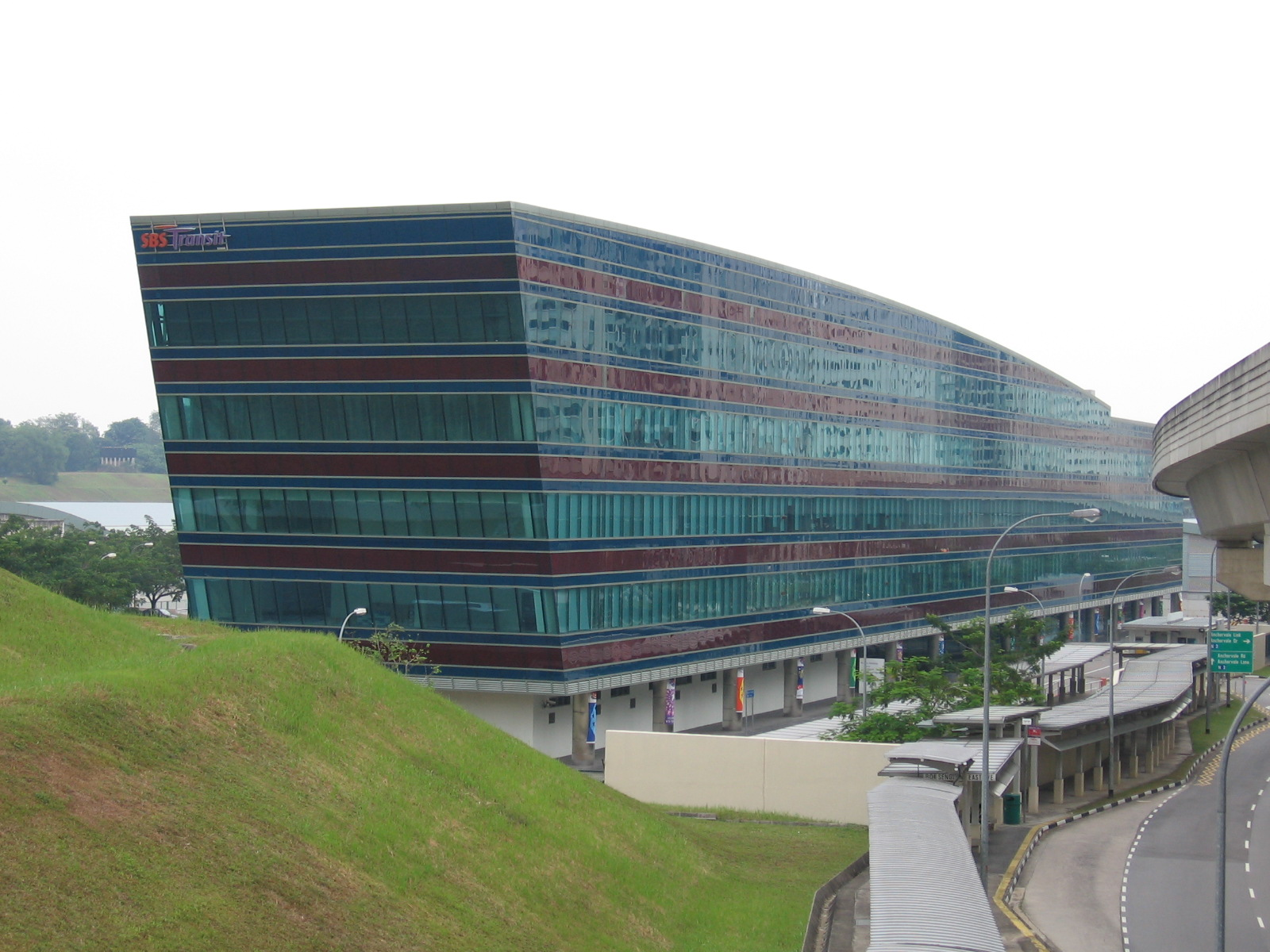
- The administration building of the depot
- Interactive map of Sengkang Depot

Location
- Location: 91 Sengkang East Avenue; Singapore 545072 (NEL); 95 Sengkang East Avenue; Singapore 545051 (LRT)
- Coordinates: 01°23′20″N 103°53′06″E

Characteristics
- Owner: Land Transport Authority
- Operator: SBS Transit
- Depot code: SKD
- Type: At-grade (MRT); Elevated (LRT)
- Roads: Sengkang East Avenue, Sengkang East Road
- Rolling stock: Heavy rail: Alstom Metropolis C751A; Alstom Metropolis C751C; Alstom Metropolis C851E; Light rail: Mitsubishi Crystal Mover (C810); Mitsubishi Crystal Mover (C810A); Mitsubishi Crystal Mover (C810D)
- Routes served: NEL North East Line; SKLRT Sengkang LRT line; PGLRT Punggol LRT line

History
- Opened: 2003; 23 years ago

Sengkang Depot is a train depot located in Sengkang, Singapore. It houses the trains of the North East Line (NEL) and the Sengkang (SKLRT) and Punggol (PGLRT) Light Rail Transit (LRT) lines, as well as the control centre of the NEL. Located beside Tongkang LRT station, it was constructed in 1997 as part of the NEL and led to the relocation of two buildings. Expansion works, intended to accommodate additional LRT trains and enhance power supply systems, began in 2022 and are expected to be completed by 2027.

== History ==
Sengkang Depot was constructed by Hyundai Engineering & Construction Co. in July 1997, at a contract sum of S$350 million. To facilitate construction, two buildings, Pelangi Home and Puat Jit Temple, were moved to temporary locations and eventually relocated. A thousand lorries were needed to excavate the depot's area, which was government land previously inhabited by squatters. Due to the lack of roads available, the lorries had to cross over from the construction site of Sengkang Depot to the main road, moving through more treacherous paths as construction progressed. In total, 3 million m^{3} (110 million cu ft) of earth was excavated during construction.

One of the two reception tracks, captured in August 2026.

On 5 February 2021, the Land Transport Authority announced plans to expand the LRT depot from the existing 3.5 hectares (35,000 m^{2}) to 11.1 hectares (111,000 m^{2}). The expanded depot would provide increased stabling capacity, a new maintenance workshop, and two new reception tracks in anticipation for the procurement of 17 two-car trains to boost the Sengkang and Punggol LRT lines' capacity. In addition, the existing power supply systems would be upgraded, and three traction power stations would be added to the existing five to improve the traction power of the additional trains. Originally due to begin at the end of 2021, expansion works began in 2022 and are scheduled to be completed by 2027.

As part of expansion works, two contracts were awarded and a partial shutdown of the Sengkang LRT line occurred. The first contract, worth $439 million, was awarded to a consortium (Note: Comprising Mitsubishi Corporation, Mitsubishi Heavy Industries Engineering and Mitsubishi Heavy Industries Asia Pacific.) for two-car trains, expansion works and a new signalling system for the expanded depot. The other contract, worth $157 million, was awarded to Sato Kogyo for expansion works only. To allow the reception tracks to be connected to the depot, it was planned that the inner track of the SKLRT's west loop (operating via Cheng Lim station) would be shut down from 19 April to 18 October 2026; shuttle bus services were provided to replace its services, while services on the outer track (via Renjong station) were operated exclusively using two-car trains. On 4 October 2026, services resumed on the inner track, 2 weeks ahead of schedule.

== Details ==
Sengkang Depot is located beside Tongkang LRT station. It covers 27 hectares (67 acres) and is split into two depots: an LRT depot at the top, and an MRT depot at the bottom.

The MRT depot contains maintenance bays where an entire NEL train can be lifted up for repair works. The depot also houses the Operations Control Centre (OCC) of the NEL, where transit officers can monitor train and station operations on the NEL. They can communicate with passengers using the intercom to address any issues, instruct them on how to evacuate trains in times of emergency, and monitor trains via cameras. The OCC also has a single terminal that controls the entire automation of the NEL, granting officers full control of the NEL.

The expanded LRT depot contains an additional maintenance workshop that allows both cars of a two-car train to be maintained simultaneously; the prior building accommodates one car at a time. It also contains a new test track; the existing one will be repurposed to connect the prior depot and the area created during expansion.

Inside the depot is a substation which has two interconnected switchboards, each being a backup for the other.
