= Punggol LRT line =

Light rail line in Singapore

Punggol LRT

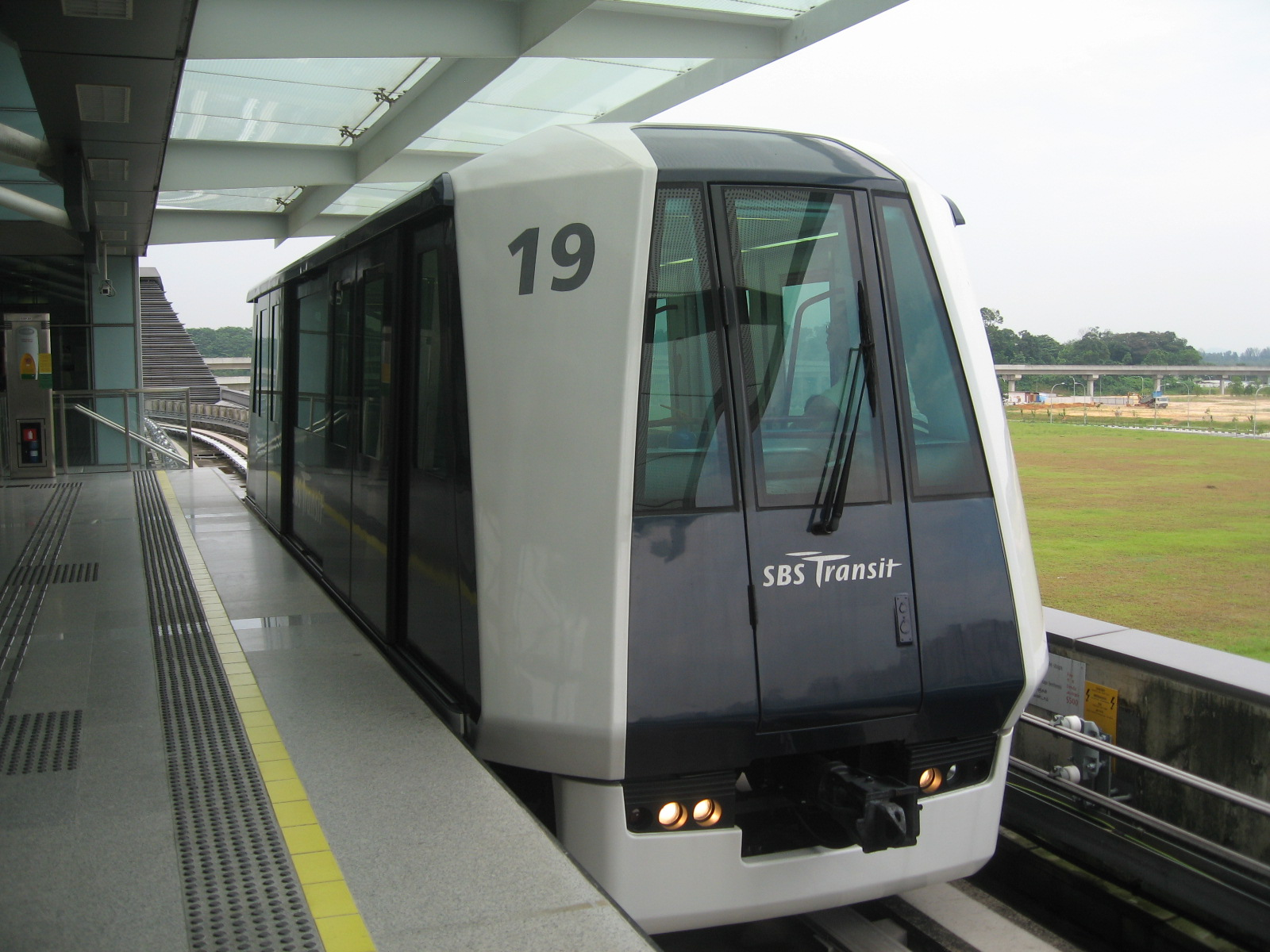
- A Mitsubishi Crystal Mover Automated People Mover at Punggol station

Overview
- Native name: Malay: Laluan LRT Punggol; Chinese: 榜鹅轻轨线; Tamil: பொங்கோல் எல்ஆர்டி வரி
- Status: Operational
- Owner: Land Transport Authority
- Locale: Singapore
- Termini: Punggol
- Stations: 15

Service
- Type: Automated guideway transit/People mover
- System: Light Rail Transit (Singapore)
- Services: 4
- Operator: SBS Transit Ltd
- Depot: Sengkang
- Rolling stock: Mitsubishi Heavy Industries Crystal Mover (C810, C810A, C810D)
- Daily ridership: 23,698 (July 2020)

History
- Opened: 29 January 2005; 21 years ago (East Loop); 29 June 2014; 12 years ago (West Loop)
- Last extension: 15 August 2024; 2 years ago (Teck Lee station)

Technical
- Line length: 10.3 km (6.4 mi)
- Character: Fully elevated
- Track gauge: 1,850 mm (6 ft 27/32 in); Guideway span: 3.2 m (10 ft 6 in)
- Electrification: 750 V DC Third rail
- Operating speed: 70 km/h (43 mph)
- Signalling: Kyosan APM fixed block system
Route map
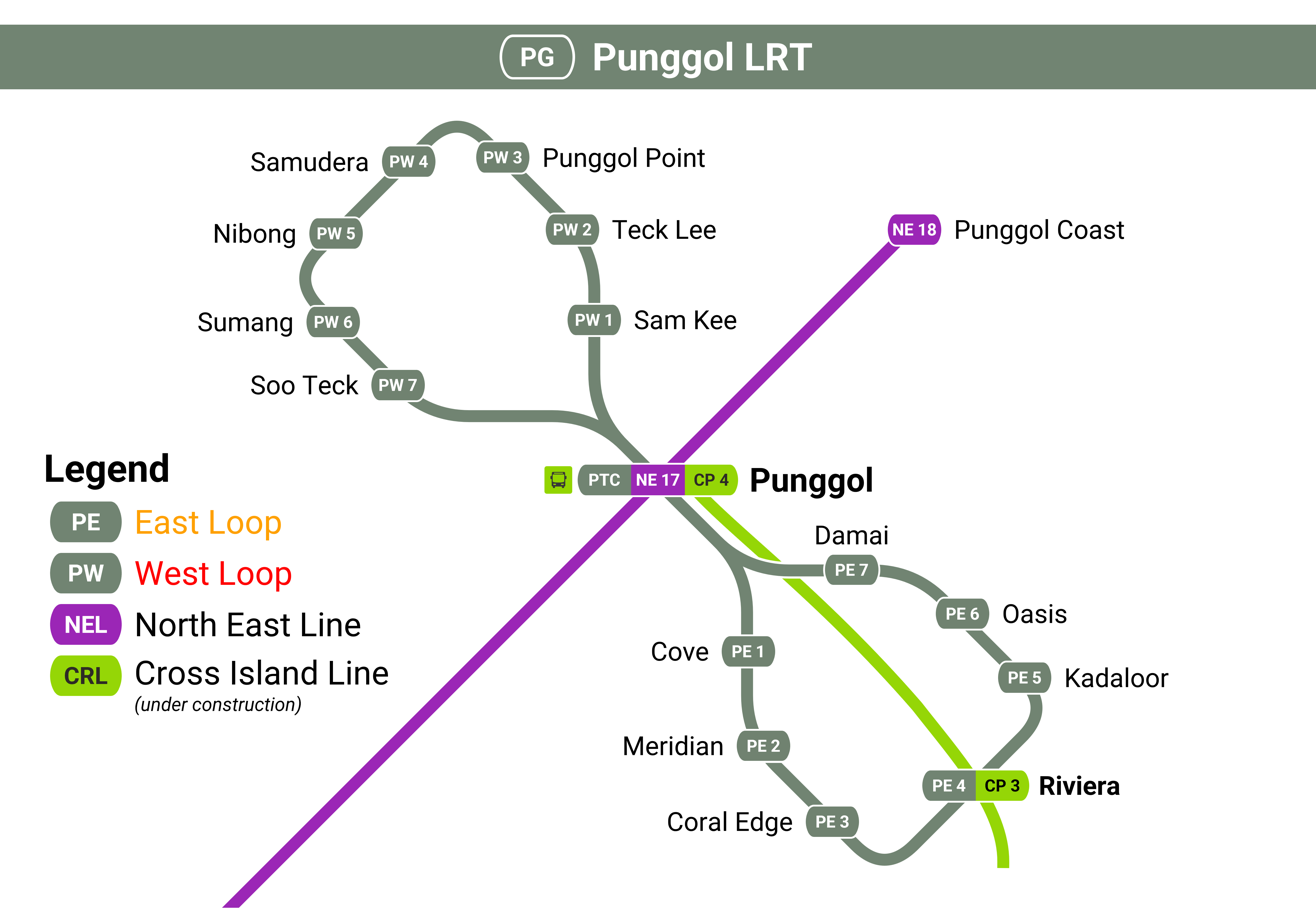

The Punggol LRT line (PGLRT) is a 10.3-kilometre (6.4 mi) elevated automated guideway transit line in Punggol, Singapore. The driverless system consists of 15 stations on two loops, with Punggol station serving as the interchange for both loops and linking the line to the North East Line on the Singapore MRT. It is the third Light Rail Transit (LRT) line in Singapore and the second LRT line to be operated by SBS Transit. (Note: The Bukit Panjang LRT line, operated by SMRT Trains, opened on 6 November 1999. The Sengkang LRT line first opened on 18 January 2003.)

The PGLRT was conceived as part of the Punggol 21 development plan announced by prime minister Goh Chok Tong in 1996. Construction of the LRT line began in June 2000 and was completed in June 2004, and the Land Transport Authority transferred operations to SBS Transit in December that year. Five of the East Loop stations began operations on 29 January 2005; Oasis station subsequently opened in 2007 and Damai station opened in 2011. The West Loop commenced operations on 29 June 2014, with Teck Lee station being the last to open, on 15 August 2024.

The line utilises the Kyosan Automated People Mover (APM) fixed block signalling system and Mitsubishi Heavy Industries's Crystal Mover APM vehicles. Two-car operations were introduced in December 2016 to accommodate increased ridership. Between 2018 and 2022, the PGLRT underwent renewal works to improve reliability. A new fleet of 33 two-car APMs entered service in 2025, replacing 25 one-car trains and half of the 16 two-car trains in the existing fleet.

== History ==
=== Planning and construction ===
At the launch of the Punggol 21 housing concept in August 1996, prime minister Goh Chok Tong announced plans for a light rail (LRT) system in Punggol. According to Mohinder Singh, the planning director of the Land Transport Authority (LTA), the LRT system was not part of the original 1991 Urban Redevelopment Authority (URA) Concept Plan, but was later jointly developed by the Housing Development Board (HDB), URA, and LTA during the planning of Punggol 21. The Sengkang and Punggol LRT systems (SPLRT) were planned in tandem, with these agencies collaborating to integrate transport and housing for optimal service. In July 1998, communications minister Mah Bow Tan confirmed the government's decision to proceed with the Punggol LRT system, with 19 stations planned on the 13-kilometre (8.1 mi) route.

The contract for the design and construction of the SPLRT was awarded to a joint venture for S$656 million (US$392 million). The joint venture comprised Singapore Technologies Industrial Corporation, Mitsubishi Heavy Industries and Mitsubishi Corporation. On 20 May 1999, SBS Transit (then Singapore Bus Service) was appointed to operate the Punggol LRT along with the North East Line and the Sengkang LRT line.

Construction of the Punggol LRT line began in June 2000 and was completed in June 2004. (Note: Only 15 out of the 19 planned stations were eventually built along the 10.3-kilometre (6.4 mi) route at a cost of S$354 million (US$209.4 million).) Due to limited funding from the 1997 financial crisis and low projected ridership, the SPLRT was initially constructed for single-car operations, even though it had been designed for two. Nevertheless, provisions were made for future conversion to two-car operations during the expected equipment replacement cycle, which was expected to occur within 15 to 20 years. The LTA conducted tests on the line before handing it over to SBS Transit in December 2004 for additional trial operations. SBS Transit announced that the East Loop would open first as the West Loop served a less populated area of Punggol at that time.

=== Stations opening ===
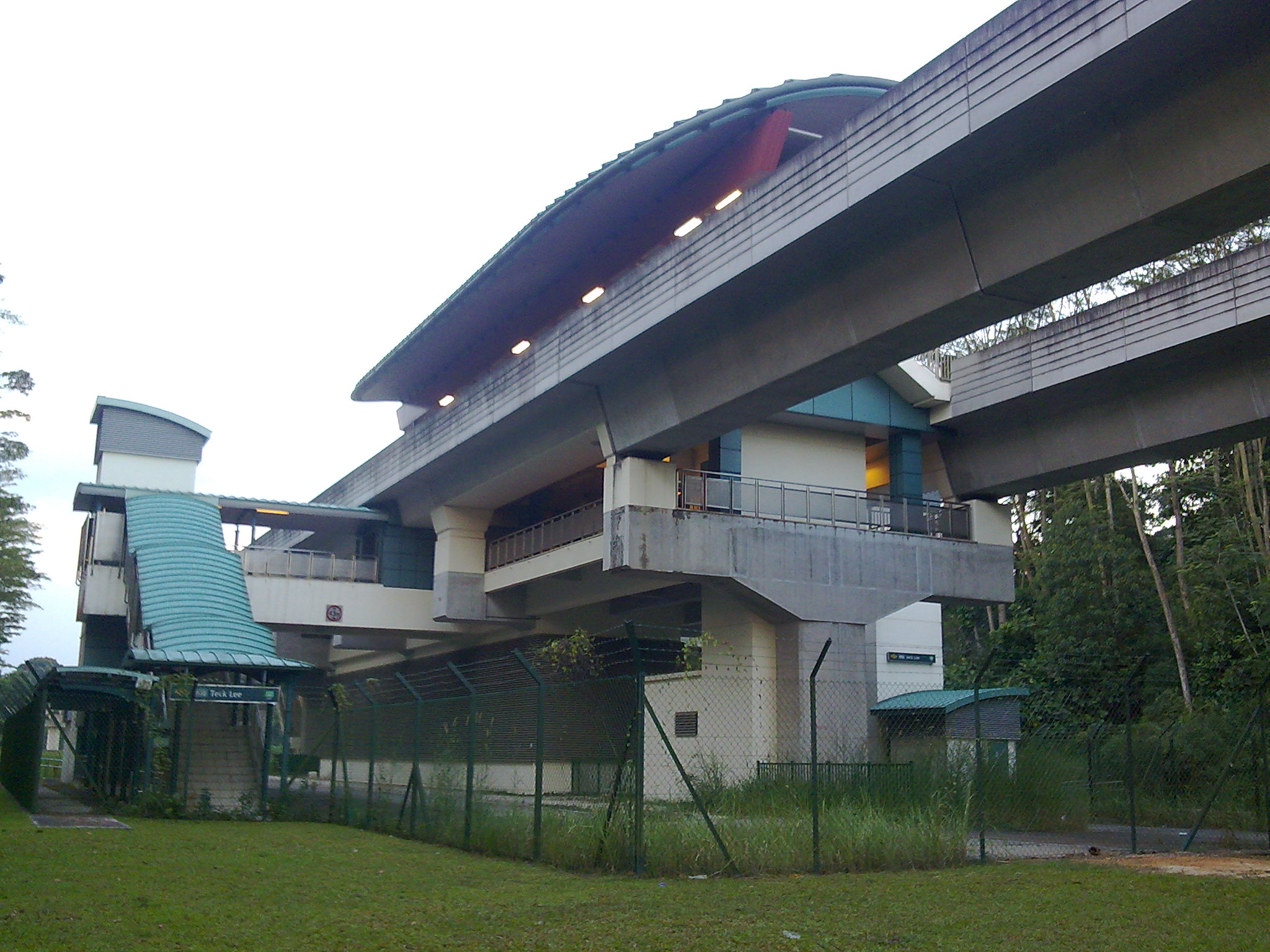
Teck Lee station (pictured in June 2009) was the last LRT station to open on the PGLRT in August 2024.

Punggol LRT line stations timeline
| Date | Project | Description |
|---|---|---|
| 29 January 2005 | East Loop | East Loop (except Oasis and Damai stations) opened for uni-directional operation. |
| 15 June 2007 | East Loop | Oasis opened. |
| 20 June 2011 | East Loop | Damai opened. Bidirectional services commenced on the East Loop. |
| 29 June 2014 | West Loop | West Loop (only Nibong, Sumang and Soo Teck stations) opened for uni-directional operation. |
| 29 February 2016 | West Loop | Sam Kee opened. |
| 29 December 2016 | West Loop | Punggol Point opened. |
| 31 March 2017 | West Loop | Samudera opened. |
| 29 September 2018 | West Loop | Bidirectional services commenced on the West loop throughout the day. |
| 15 August 2024 | West Loop | Teck Lee opened. |

On 10 January 2005, SBS Transit confirmed that the East Loop would open on 29 January, with the exception of the Oasis and Damai stations. The opening ceremony on the day itself was officiated by transport minister Yeo Cheow Tong. Early ridership remained low, especially due to the SARS outbreak. The East Loop initially operated unidirectional services in the peak flow direction. Morning services from 5:20 am to 3:00 pm ran anti-clockwise from Kadaloor to Punggol, while evening services from 3:00 pm to 12:35 am operated clockwise from Punggol to Kadaloor. After requests by residents to open Oasis station, the station opened on 15 June 2007. Damai station opened on 20 June 2011 and bidirectional services commenced on the East Loop.

The West Loop began operations from 29 June 2014 with the opening of Nibong, Sumang and Soo Teck stations. The West Loop initially operated unidirectional services at a frequency of 7 to 8 minutes, with morning services running from Nibong to Punggol, and evening services running from Punggol to Nibong via Soo Teck. Sam Kee station opened on 29 February 2016 to serve the Punggol Waterway Park and SAFRA Punggol Clubhouse.

Punggol Point station opened on 29 December 2016. Samudera station opened on 31 March 2017 to serve Marina Country Club. Bidirectional services on the West Loop commenced on 29 September 2018 in response to increased ridership. In May 2024, CNA reported that a post on the Singapore Institute of Technology (SIT) website had mentioned Teck Lee station was scheduled to open in August. However, the information was later removed. The LTA later clarified that the planned opening of Teck Lee station was part of its broader efforts to improve public transport connectivity for students in anticipation of the upcoming SIT campus in Punggol. As announced by the LTA on 31 July, Teck Lee station opened on 15 August 2024.

=== Improvements ===
On 31 October 2012, the LTA announced plans to increase passenger capacity of the SPLRT to cater to increased ridership. The upgrading works involved retrofitting 16 of the 41 one-car trains for two-car operations while purchasing 16 additional cars. After tests for two-car operations on the Punggol LRT began on 5 December 2016, two-car operations officially commenced on the East Loop from 29 December.

On 15 December 2017, the LTA announced plans to renew and upgrade the SPLRT to enhance its operational reliability. The works included replacing the power rail and its assemblies, along with conducting maintenance on the signalling switch machines and cables. Additionally, the crossheads supporting the viaducts were to be reinforced and the viaduct bearings replaced, following the discovery of cracks on the crossheads during routine inspections.

The maintenance works took place on selected Sunday mornings from 14 January to 25 February 2018. On these days, the affected loops ran unidirectional services from 5:30 am to 7:00 am. Unidirectional services remained in operation on Sunday mornings from 4 March to 29 April due to the extension of maintenance works on the SPLRT. These works involved replacing the power rail and power rail assemblies, as well as carrying out preventive maintenance on the signalling cables. Rectification works on the concrete plinths and elevated slabs were conducted on Sunday evenings between 27 May and 7 October. These works involved breaking up the existing concrete plinths, realigning the finger joints, and recementing them into position. Maintenance works during service hours continued in 2020, 2021, and 2022. On 9 June 2024, the signalling system's power supply failed during upgrading works. As a result, no trains could be launched on that morning, with services only resuming at 10:12 am.

On 5 February 2021, the LTA announced plans to purchase 17 two-car trains for the SPLRT, which were expected to be delivered from 2024 to 2027. The 3.5 ha (8.6-acre) Sengkang Depot would also be expanded to 11.1 ha (27.4 acres) to ensure additional capacity and maintenance space for the new trains. The depot expansion also included the construction of two new reception tracks to reduce train launching time. In February 2022, the contract for the depot expansion was awarded to Sato Kogyo (S) Pte Ltd for S$157 million (US$117.2 million), and the contract for the new fleet of trains was awarded to Mitsubishi Corporation for S$439 million (US$327.6 million).

== Network and operations ==
=== Route and service ===
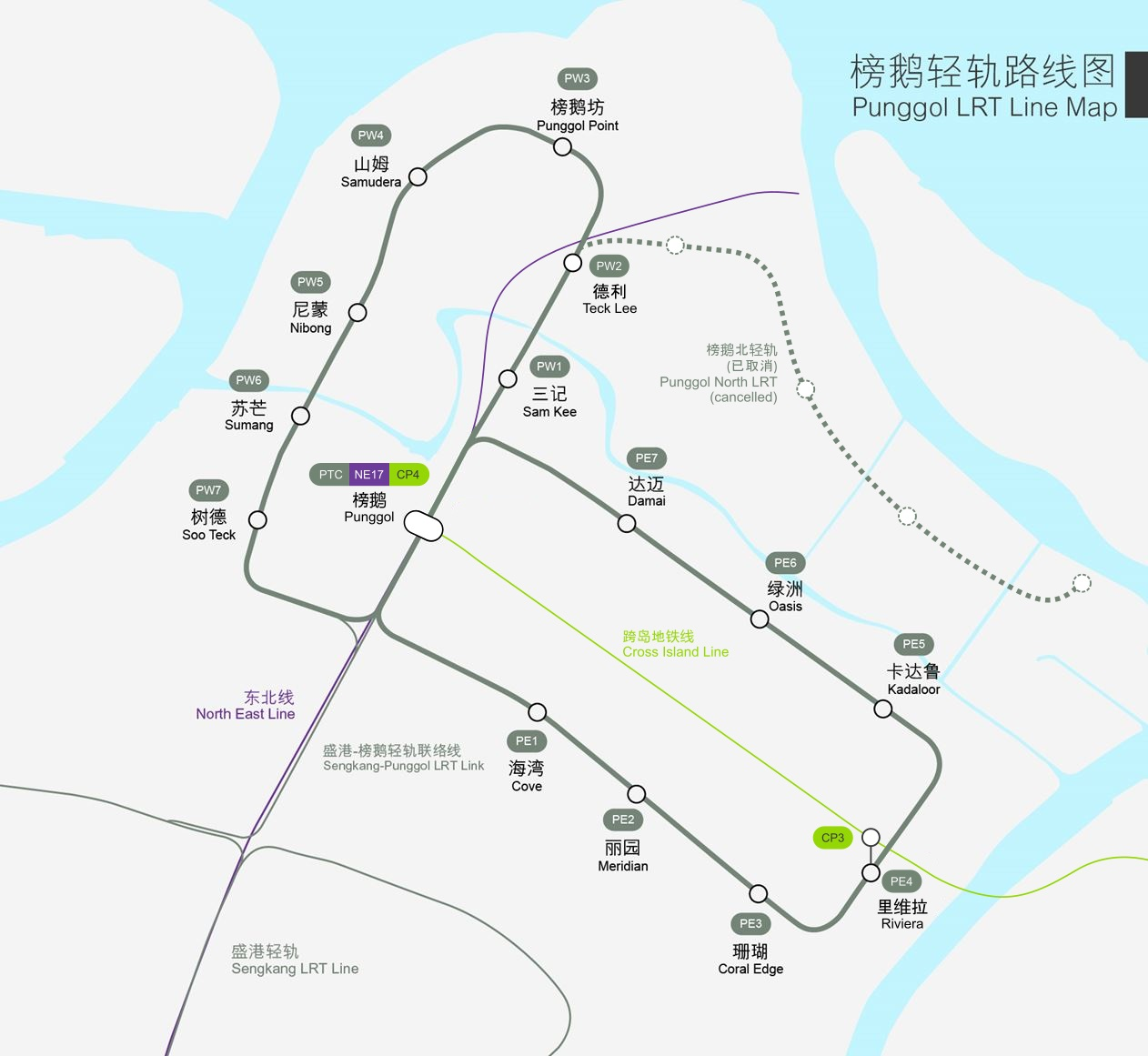
Geographic route map of Punggol LRT.

The Punggol LRT line (PGLRT) is a fully elevated automated guideway transit line, (Note: Also called an "Automated People Mover" (APM) by Mitsubishi.) with a route length of 10.3 kilometres (6.4 miles). It is coloured grey on official maps. On dynamic passenger information displays and static signs on the LRT platforms, yellow indicates the east loop, and red indicates the west loop. The two loops of the PGLRT have been described as a pair of "butterfly wings" that converge at Punggol station, which connects the LRT to the North East Line (NEL) and the future Cross Island Line (CRL) on the Singapore MRT.

On the East Loop, the line heads south before curving southeast and running along the median of Punggol Field. After Coral Edge station, the line turns northwards along Punggol East to Riviera before turning west to Kadaloor. The loop continues along Punggol Drive before turning south toward Punggol station.

On the West Loop, the line heads north to Sam Kee station before crossing Punggol Waterway. It runs along Sentul Walk before turning west toward Punggol Point station. The line continues along Punggol Way as it turns south after Samudera station. Between Nibong and Sumang, the loop crosses the Punggol Waterway once more, and after Soo Teck station, the line turns east and north back to Punggol station. A spur connects the PGLRT to the Sengkang LRT line across the Tampines Expressway.

The line operates between 5:18 am (5:38 am on Sundays and public holidays) and 12:40 am daily. The PGLRT is operated by SBS Transit. Since 2018, the PGLRT has been part of the New Rail Financing Framework (NRFF). Previously, the operator (the owner of the rail assets) had to bear the cost of maintaining and upgrading trains and signalling. Under the NRFF, the LTA and SBS Transit share the profits and financial risks in operating the line and the LTA will take control of its operating assets on 1 April 2033. SBS Transit operate the line under a 15-year licence which will expire on 31 March 2033. To ease the morning crowds riding on the NEL, from 27 December 2025, free fares apply to those tapping in at any of the stations on the SPLRT on weekday mornings before 7.30 am, or between 9 am and 9.45 am.

=== Stations ===
The PGLRT has 15 stations – 7 stations on the East Loop, 7 stations on the West Loop, and Punggol station, which serves as an interchange for both loops. Each station was positioned to serve residents within a 400-metre (1,300 ft) radius.

| Station code | Station name | Images | Opening | Further information | Location(s) |
|---|---|---|---|---|---|
| PTC NE17 CP4 | Punggol | Punggol LRT platform | 29 January 2005; 21 years ago | Interchange with North East Line and CRL Punggol Extension (2032); Close to the Punggol Bus Interchange | 01°24′19″N 103°54′09″E |
East Loop
| PE1 | Cove | Exterior of Cove LRT | 29 January 2005; 21 years ago | Named after their respective Residents' Committees. | 1°23′53.20″N 103°54′20.61″E |
| PE2 | Meridian | Meridian LRT platforms | 29 January 2005; 21 years ago | Named after their respective Residents' Committees. | 1°23′50.51″N 103°54′30.93″E |
| PE3 | Coral Edge | | 29 January 2005; 21 years ago | Named after the HDB precinct. | 1°23′40.73″N 103°54′43.34″E |
| PE4 – CP3 | Riviera | Riviera LRT platforms | 29 January 2005; 21 years ago | Interchange with CRL Punggol Extension (2032); Named to reflect the seaside theme. | 1°23′39.98″N 103°55′0.38″E |
| PE5 | Kadaloor | Kadaloor LRT platforms | 29 January 2005; 21 years ago | The name means "seaside town" in Tamil. | 1°23′58.87″N 103°54′58.87″E |
| PE6 | Oasis | Concourse level of Oasis station with faregates | 15 June 2007; 19 years ago | The station is directly connected with Oasis Terraces and Punggol Polyclinic. | 1°24′08.53″N 103°54′44.72″E |
| PE7 | Damai | Damai LRT platforms | 20 June 2011; 15 years ago | The name means "peaceful" in Malay. | 1°24′17.33″N 103°54′31.95″E |
West Loop
| PW1 | Sam Kee | Sam Kee LRT platforms | 29 February 2016; 10 years ago | Named after a former village in the area. The station serves the SAFRA Punggol Clubhouse. | 1°24′35.10″N 103°54′16.50″E |
| PW2 | Teck Lee | Teck Lee LRT platforms | 15 August 2024; 2 years ago | Named after Lim Teck Lee, a person said to be prominent in Punggol. The station serves the Punggol Digital District and the Singapore Institute of Technology. | 1°24′46.08″N 103°54′22.44″E |
| PW3 | Punggol Point | Punggol Point LRT platforms | 29 December 2016; 9 years ago | Named after its close proximity to Punggol Point. | 1°25′0.78″N 103°54′22.87″E |
| PW4 | Samudera | Samudera LRT platforms | 31 March 2017; 9 years ago | The name means "sea" in Tamil. The station is directly linked to Northshore Plaza and serves the Marina Country Club. | 1°24′57.42″N 103°54′6.68″E |
| PW5 | Nibong | Nibong LRT platforms | 29 June 2014; 12 years ago | Named after the nibong poles and stilts used to support Malay village homes. | 1°24′42.76″N 103°54′0.10″E |
| PW6 | Sumang | Sumang LRT platforms | 29 June 2014; 12 years ago | Named after Wak Sumang, who founded Punggol village. | 1°24′29″N 103°53′55″E |
| PW7 | Soo Teck | Soo Teck LRT platforms | 29 June 2014; 12 years ago | Named after a former primary school within the vicinity. | 1°24′19.5″N 103°53′49.0″E |

== Infrastructure ==
=== Rolling stock ===
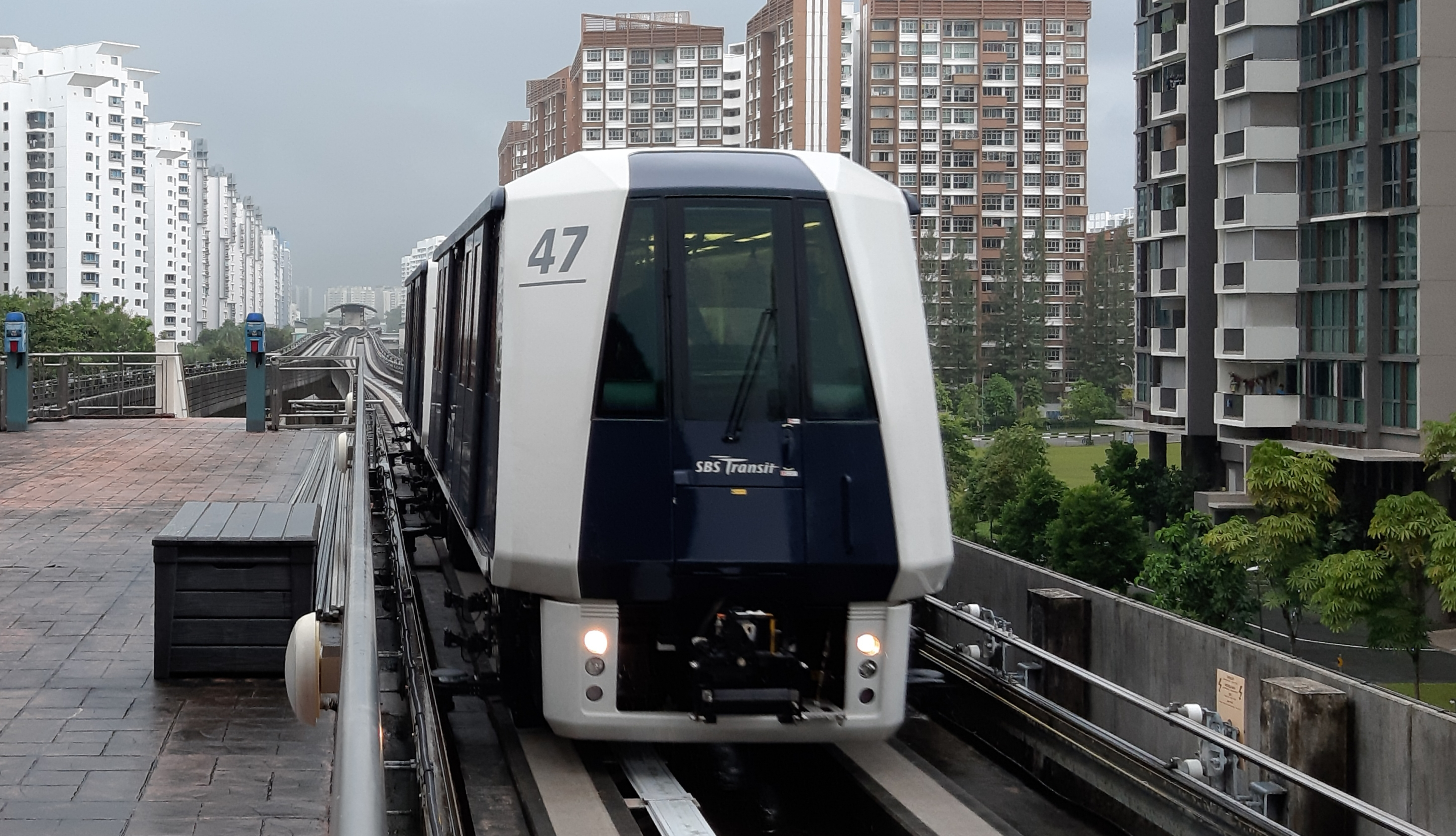
A two-car Mitsubishi Crystal Mover approaching Kadaloor station

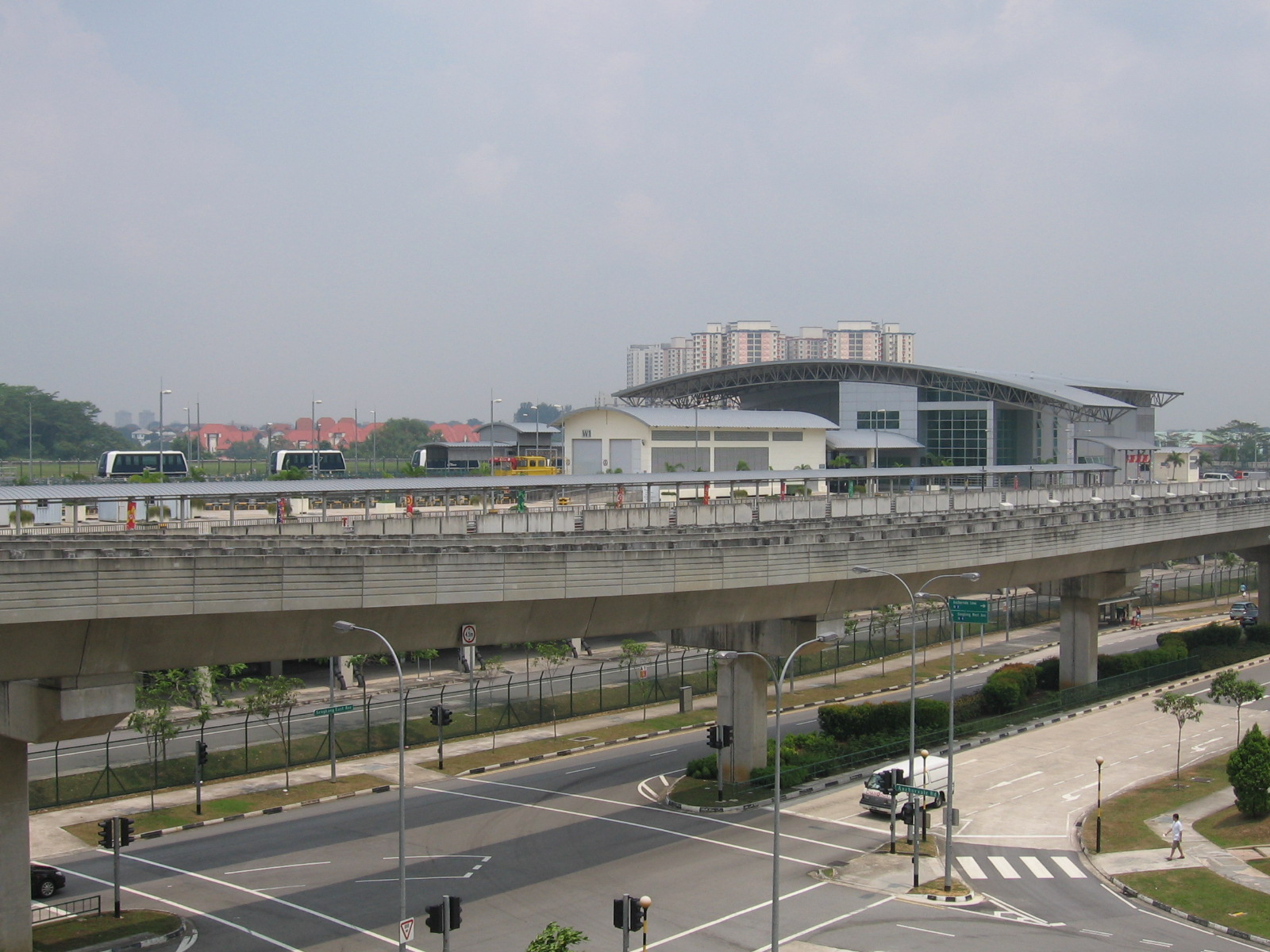
The LRT trains on the Sengkang–Punggol LRT lines are parked at the top level of Sengkang Depot.

The Sengkang and Punggol LRT lines (SPLRT) utilise the Crystal Mover Automated People Mover (APM) rolling stock manufactured by Mitsubishi Heavy Industries. The rubber-tyred trains are fully automatic and can accommodate up to 105 passengers per vehicle. The SPLRT has an initial fleet of 41 APMs, with 16 more APMs delivered under contract C810A. The APMs are configured for single car or two-car operations, with a maximum capacity of 36 trainsets on the network. In February 2022, the LTA ordered another fleet of 17 two-car APMs (Note: Under contract 810D) from Mitsubishi for S$439 million. This was followed by another order for eight more two-car trains in May 2023, costing S$87 million. The new trains are set to replace the 25 one-car trains and half of the 16 two-car trains, bringing the overall SPLRT fleet to 33 two-car APMs. The first two trainsets were delivered to Singapore on 23 November 2024 and are expected to commence operations in 2025. Eight additional LRT trains would be procured, bringing the SPLRT fleet to 41 two-car APMs by 2030.

The APMs have a top speed of 80 km/h (50 mph), with a maximum operational speed of 70 km/h (43 mph). They are powered by 750 V DC third rail located on one side of the guideway. Each vehicle is 11.84 m (38.8 ft) long and 2.69 m (8.8 ft) wide. The exterior has a crystal-like design with a polyhedral nose reflective of its namesake. Mitsubishi describes the curved sides of the APM as a design choice to "soften" the sharpness of its polyhedral shape. The exterior is painted pearl white and indigo blue.

As driverless vehicles, the APMs do not include a driver cabin. Instead, detrainment doors at both ends of the cabin allow emergency evacuation of passengers onto the track. The emergency stop button and emergency notice system are located at the right-side corner of the vehicle's front, while line maps and service information are displayed on the left. The interior features white side panels and ceiling, a grey floor, greyish-blue seats, and handrails and grip bars accented in a wine colour. The cabins are air-conditioned.

The SPLRT trains are maintained and stabled on the second floor of Sengkang Depot. Located between the Layar and Tongkang LRT stations on the Sengkang LRT line, the depot also houses the trains of the North East Line. Its facilitates include a two-story main building with an operation control centre room, automatic vehicle washing facility, maintenance garage, departure inspection track, stabling yard, power receiving and transforming facilities, and a test track. The 3.5-hectare (8.6-acre) site is being expanded to 11.1 hectares (27 acres), which will include two more reception tracks and three new traction power substations to expand the depot's stabling and maintenance capacity.

=== Train control and power system ===
The Punggol LRT line is fully automatic and is equipped with a Kyosan APM fixed block signalling system. The line's automatic train control (ATC) is composed of automatic train protection (ATP) which ensures safe operations, automatic train operation (ATO) which controls the automatic operations, and automatic train supervision (ATS) for overall command, monitoring and recording of the system. To reduce equipment mass on the train, the onboard ATP and ATO systems are integrated into one unit, although for safety reasons, the function and control logic of the ATP and ATO systems remain independent. These subsystems are connected via LAN and managed by a computer-based interlocking (CBI) system that oversees traffic safety of the APM.

The power system of the SPLRT includes a 22 kV AC power intake and distribution network, a 750 V DC traction power system, and a 400 V AC system for station services. Power is supplied via two 22 kV AC feeders from the North East Line to improve reliability and take advantage of the 66 kV tariff. The AC supply is distributed through a closed ring network to prevent power disruptions during single outages. At each station, the AC supply is stepped down to 400 V AC using service transformers for mechanical and electrical needs. Traction power substations (TPSS) further step down the 22 kV AC to power rectifiers that convert it to 750 V DC for train operations. Each TPSS is equipped with an inverter system to return excess energy from regenerative braking back to the 22 kV distribution network. In 2004, the SKLRT had three traction power substations (TPSS), with one on standby to maintain operations during outages; it presently has five operational substations, which will increase to eight with the planned expansion of Sengkang Depot.

=== Station facilities ===
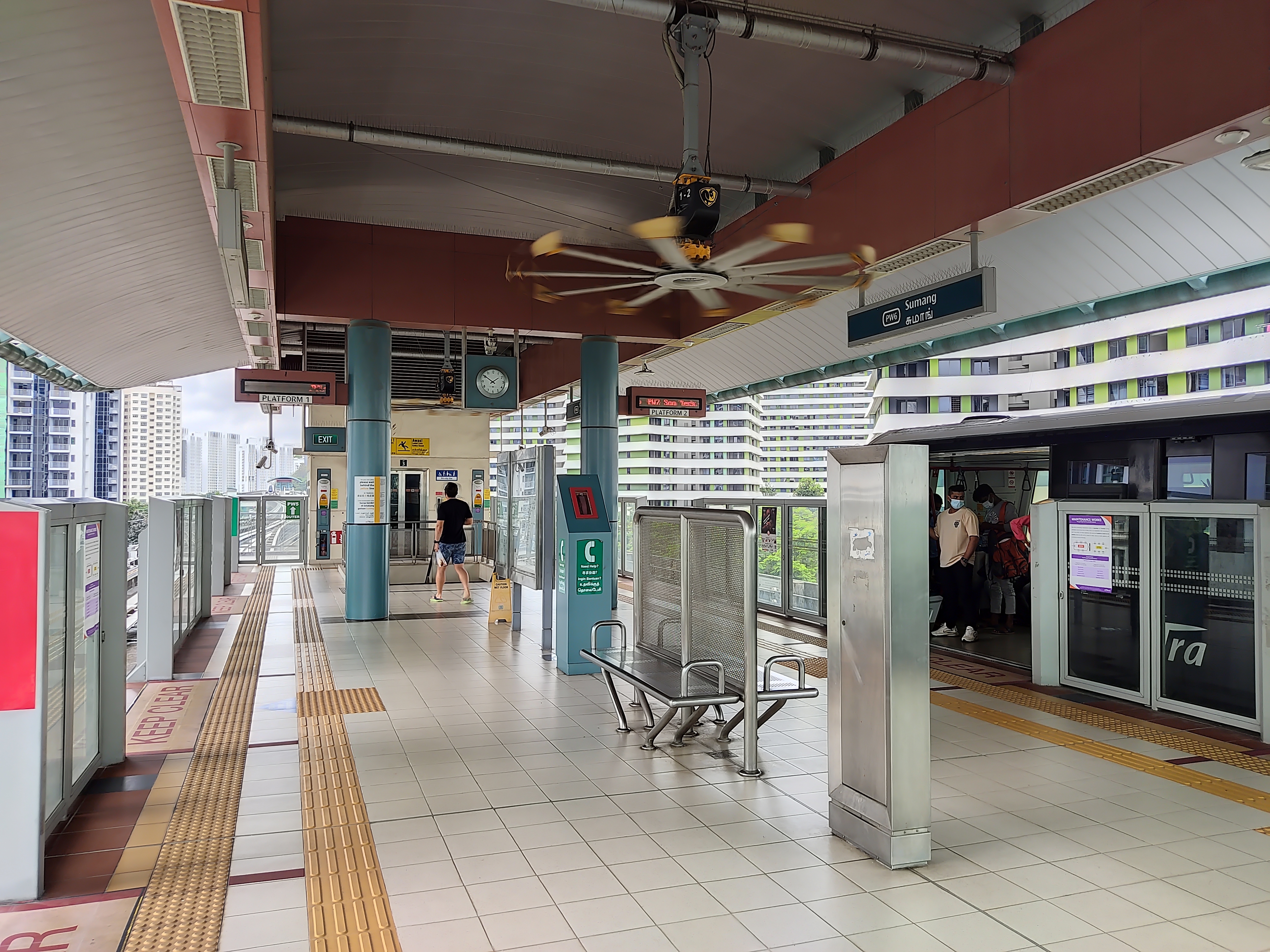
Platform barriers and a fire phone on Sumang LRT platforms

All Punggol LRT stations are equipped with lifts connecting passengers from the ground level to the station concourse, and from the concourse to the platform level. Each station also has at least one wider faregate for wheelchair users and tactile flooring to guide the visually-impaired from the ground floor to the platforms. The stations are also equipped with fire extinguishers and fire phones. Emergency stop buttons on both sides of the station platform, when activated, cut off traction power supply and halt incoming trains.

Fixed platform barriers installed by Chee Yam Contractor are intended to prevent commuters falling to the tracks. The barriers at the other LRT stations lack doors and instead have fixed openings for boarding, as the limited space on LRT platforms cannot accommodate the power, communications, and signal control systems required for platform screen doors.

Following a few track fatalities reported on the LRT, especially after a 33-year-old woman was found dead at Cove station along the East Loop, SBS Transit has implemented the VAnGuard track intrusion detection system on the SPLRT to enhance safety. Using video analytics and artificial intelligence, the system monitors footage of tracks and platforms to identify individuals or objects on the tracks. When an intrusion is detected, operations control centre staff can press the emergency stop button to halt services on a specific loop. The system also triggers an alarm when intruders or foreign objects are detected. In addition to track intrusions, the system can spot unattended items on station platforms, allowing staff to provide assistance or undertake security precautions.

== Notes and references ==
=== Sources ===
- APM Signaling System (PDF) (Report). Japan: Kyosan Electric. n.d.
- Ludher, Elyssa (2021). Punggol: From Farmland to Smart Eco-Town (PDF). Singapore: Centre for Liveable Cities. ISBN 978-981-18-1908-7.
- Mochidome, Hiroyuki; Masukawa, Masahisa (June 2003). Automated People Mover System "Crystal Mover" for Singapore's LTA (PDF) (Report). Japan: Mitsubishi Heavy Industries.
