= Changi Airport Skytrain =

Automated people mover system at Singapore's Changi Airport

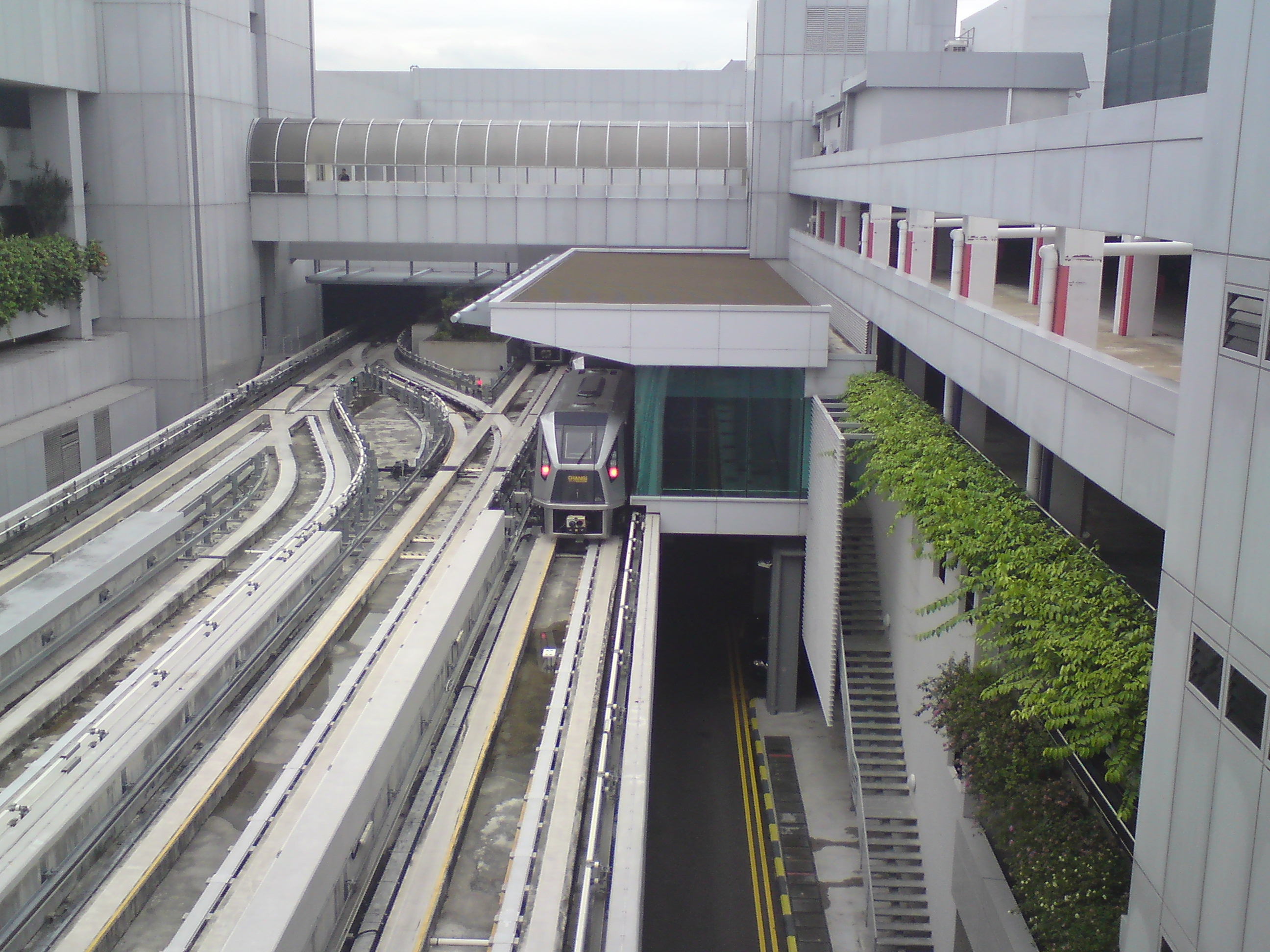
- Changi Airport SkyTrain Terminal 2 station

Overview
- Status: Operational
- Owner: Changi Airport Group
- Locale: Singapore
- Stations: 7

Service
- Type: Automated guideway transit/people mover
- Services: 5
- Operator: Changi Airport Group
- Depot(s): Terminal 1 (Public) & Terminal 3 (Airside)
- Rolling stock: Mitsubishi Crystal Mover (2006–present); Adtranz C-100 (1990–2006)

History
- Opened: 22 November 1990; 35 years ago

Technical
- Line length: 10.3 km (6.4 mi)
- Character: Fully elevated
- Track gauge: 1,850 mm (6 ft 27/32 in); Guide rail span: 3.2 m (10 ft 6 in)
- Electrification: 750 V DC third rail
- Operating speed: 50 km/h (31 mph)
- Signalling: Kyosan APM fixed block ATC under ATO GoA 4 (UTO), with subsystems of ATP, ATS and CBI

The Changi Airport Skytrain is an automated people mover system (APM, also called PMS) that connects Terminals 1, 2 and 3 at Singapore Changi Airport. Opened in 1990, it was the first driverless and automated system of its kind in South East Asia. The Changi Airport Skytrain operates from 05:00 to 02:30 daily. Traveling on the Skytrain is free and an inter-terminal journey takes approximately four minutes.

Since 2006, the trains operating on all Skytrain lines are Crystal Movers manufactured by Mitsubishi Heavy Industries. All stations are equipped with platform screen doors, are air-conditioned and have plasma displays indicating the arrival time of the next train.

With the opening of Changi Airport MRT station on 8 February 2002, the Skytrain is able to connect passengers at Terminal 1 to the MRT station entrances located at Terminals 2 and 3.

== History ==
In November 1990, alongside the opening of Changi Airport's second passenger terminal, the Skytrain began operations to connect the brand new Terminal 2 to the existing Terminal 1. It operated using the Adtranz C-100 and the ride lasted approximately 60 seconds.

On 17 March 2006, the rolling stock was replaced with the current Mitsubishi Crystal Mover System. Services were extended to the newly opened Terminal 3 and the South section opened in November 2007 with 5 new stations.

In April 2020, due to the COVID-19 pandemic drastically reducing passenger volumes, services from Station B to E (T2 to T3) and Station A to F (T2 to T3) were suspended for all passengers, as well as Station B to C (T3 to T1) and Station D to E (T1 to T2) services for transit passengers. All Skytrain services were then fully suspended on 1 May 2020.

On 27 July 2020, services from Station B to C (T3 to T1) were resumed for public passengers only.

On 17 November 2022, services from Station B to E (T3 to T2) were resumed for public passengers only.

== System ==
The system consists of seven stations (Station A-South and Station A as well as Station B serving Terminal 3, Station C and Station D serving Terminal 1, Station E and Station F serving Terminal 2), each giving the name of the nearest boarding gate for easy recognition for passengers.

The Skytrain system consists of two independent APMs: an airside-only APM, which provides services between Terminals 2 (Station F) and Terminal 3 main building (Station A) as well as between the Terminal 3 main building (Station A) and Terminal 3 South Pier (Station A South); and a separate APM that provides services between Terminals 1, 2 and 3 on both the landside and airside. The system use a bypass shuttle for services between Terminals 2 (Station E) and 3 (Station B) and single-lane shuttles for the rest of the system, with both the landside and airside having their own lanes between Terminal 1 (Station D) and Terminal 2 (Station E) as well as between Terminal 1 (Station C) and Terminal 3 (Station B).

The Main Operation Control Center is located inside the maintenance office near A-South Station and the Standby Satellite Control Center is located in the center of the Terminal 3 building. Either of the control centers can be used to control the entire system.

== Rolling stock ==
=== Adtranz C-100 ===
Initially, the Skytrain first-generation rolling stock consisted of Adtranz C-100s, jointly built by Westinghouse and Adtranz (acquired by Bombardier). Although stations were designed to accommodate two-car trains, the C-100 trains operated in single units, without a second carriage per train, and the two innermost platform screen doors of each station were for emergency purposes (the trains stopped at the outer half of each station, with two doors on each half).

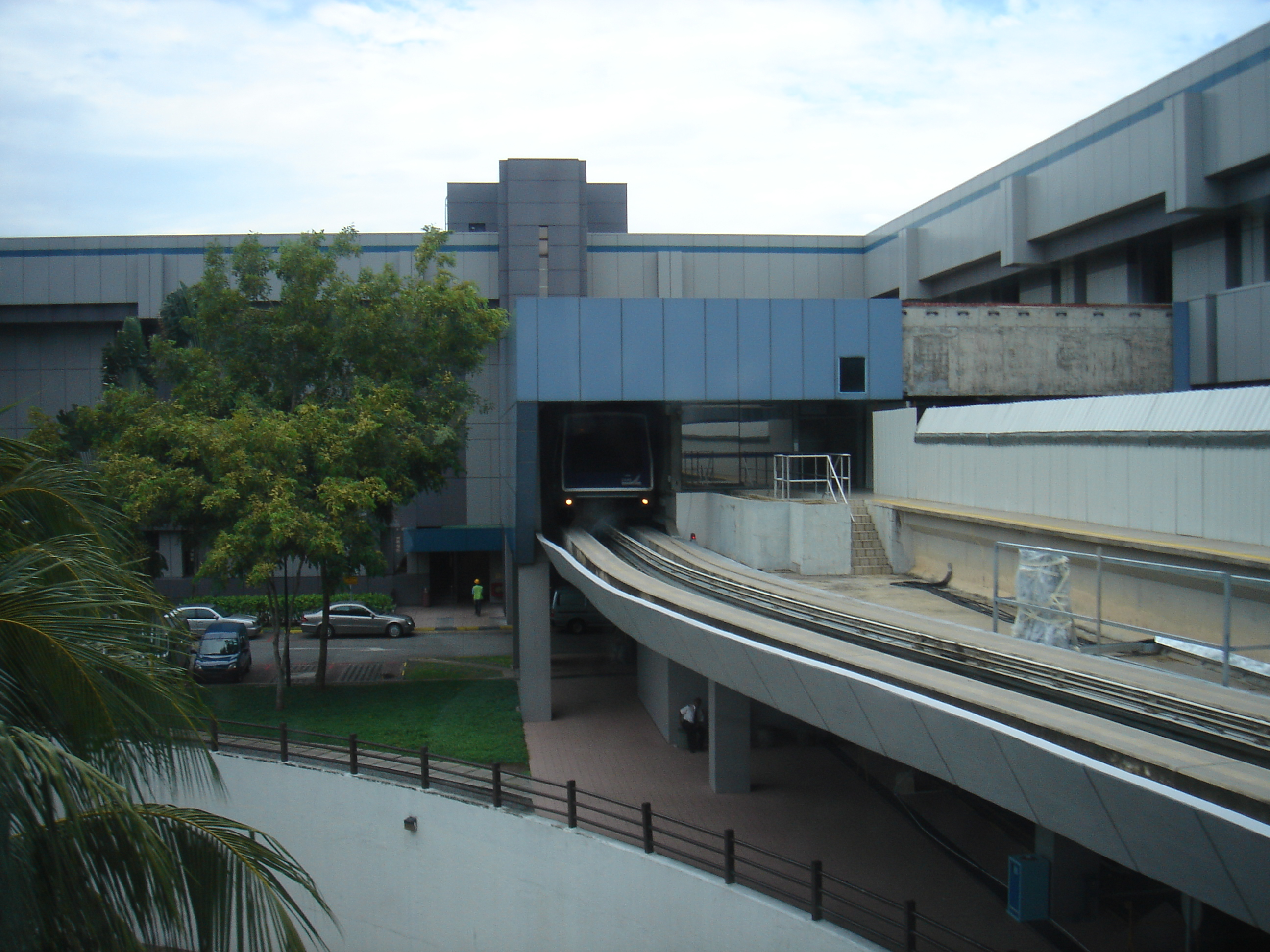
An Adtranz C-100 car, as seen inside the landside station of Terminal 1

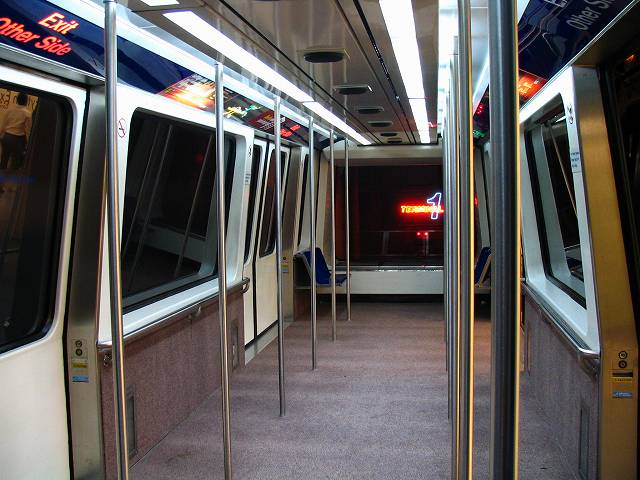
Interior of a C-100 car on the Skytrain, as seen in the 90s

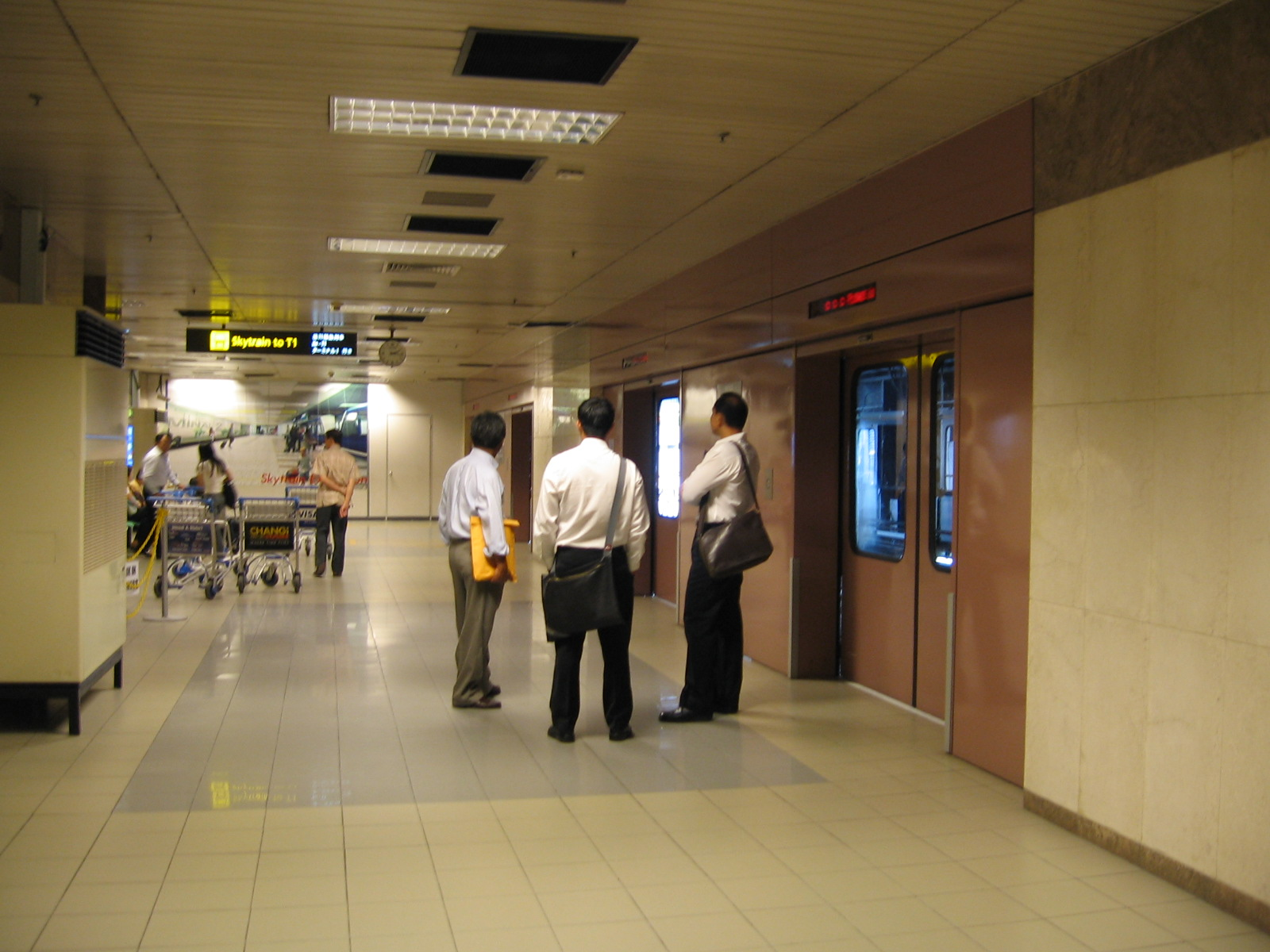
The original platform screen doors used before the upgrading project on the Skytrain in 2006

=== Mitsubishi Heavy Industries Crystal Mover ===
Mitsubishi Heavy Industries Crystal Mover
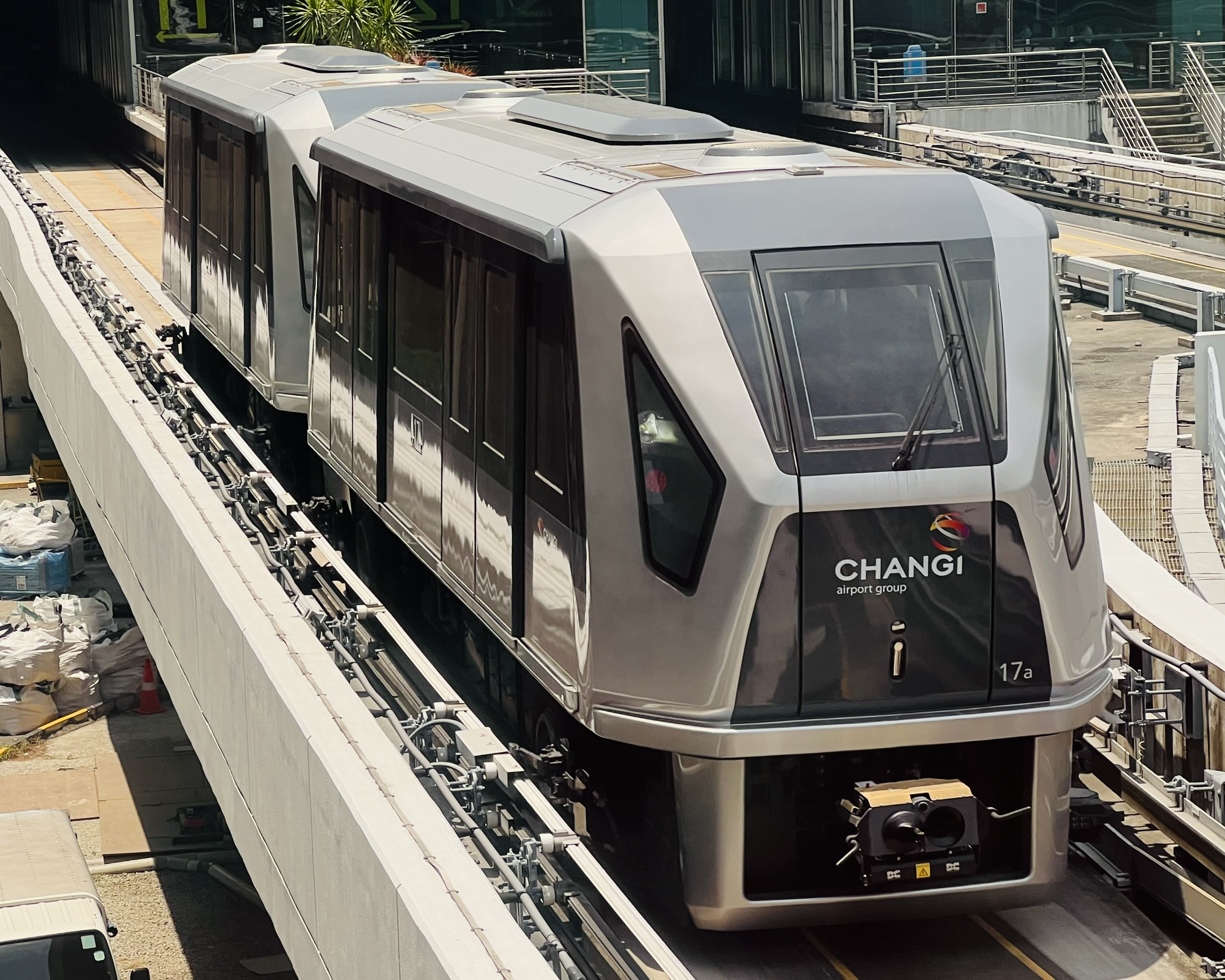
- Two skytrain cars coupled together departing Terminal 3

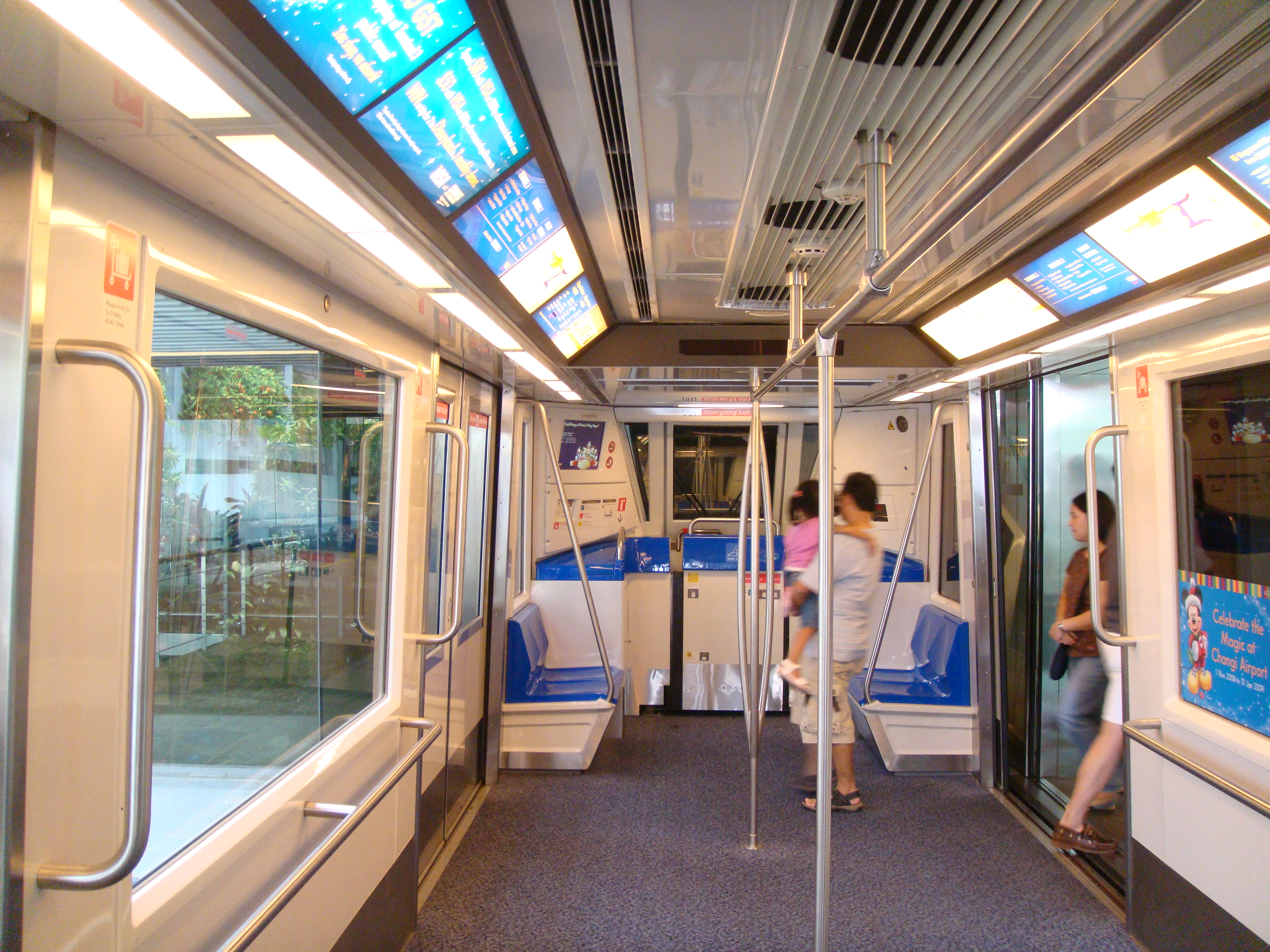
- Interior of the Skytrain Crystal Mover on PMS/North; trains on PMS/South feature orange seats
- Stock type: Rubber-tyres automated people mover
- In service: 17 March 2006; 20 years ago – present
- Manufacturer: Mitsubishi Heavy Industries
- Built at: Mihara, Hiroshima
- Family name: Crystal Mover
- Replaced: Adtranz C-100
- Constructed: 2002–2006 (cars 01–16); 2016–2019 (cars 17–22)
- Entered service: 2006
- Number built: 22 vehicles
- Number in service: 22 vehicles
- Formation: Single vehicles that can be coupled to form 2- or 3-car trains
- Fleet numbers: 01 – 22
- Capacity: 8 seated, 107 standing
- Operator: Changi Airport Group
- Depots: Terminal 1 & Terminal 3 (Airside trains only)
- Line served: All Skytrain services

Specifications
- Car body construction: Welded aluminium
- Train length: 12.55 m (41 ft 2 in)
- Car length: 12.55 m (41 ft 2 in)
- Width: 2.69 m (8 ft 10 in)
- Height: 3,725 mm (12 ft 2.7 in)
- Doors: 4 per car
- Maximum speed: 60 km/h (37 mph) (design); 50 km/h (31 mph) (service)
- Weight: 15 t (15 long tons; 17 short tons) per car
- Traction system: Mitsubishi IGBT–VVVF inverter vector control
- Traction motors: 2 × 80 kW (110 hp) 3-phase AC induction motor
- Power output: 160 kW (210 hp)
- Acceleration: 1 m/s^{2} (3.3 ft/s^{2})
- Deceleration: 1 m/s^{2} (3.3 ft/s^{2}) (service); 1.3 m/s^{2} (4.3 ft/s^{2}) (emergency)
- Electric systems: 750 V DC third rail
- Current collection: Collector shoe
- UIC classification: AA
- Braking systems: Electric command pneumatic brake with regenerative brake with stand-by brake and parking brake (with variable load control and wheel slide prevention control)
- Safety systems: Kyosan APM fixed block ATC under ATO GoA 4 (UTO), with subsystems of ATP, ATS and CBI
- Coupling system: Dellner
- Track gauge: 1,850 mm (6 ft 27/32 in); Guide rail span: 3.2 m (10 ft 6 in)

In 2002, work began on a new S$135 million Mitsubishi Crystal Mover-based system to accommodate the planned opening of Changi Airport Terminal 3 and the projected increase in demand as the airport expanded. During the upgrade, the existing C-100 system continued operations on one of the tracks while the other was upgraded from December 2004 to 16 March 2006, after which the latter resumed operations while the former was closed for upgrading.

==== Overview ====
Mitsubishi delivered 16 Crystal Mover vehicles to Singapore Changi Airport, ten of which are allocated to APM (North side) and six to APM (South side). Five different designs with innovative external face images derived from the original Crystal Mover design were proposed to Changi Airport, with the final vehicle design being awarded the Good Design Award in 2006.

The Crystal Mover was also designed for flexible response to a variety of operations, from a one car operation to multiple coupled-car operations, depending upon the system requirements; this is seen in the use of dual-car operations for APM (North side) landside and APM (South side), single-car operations for APM (North side) airside and triple-car operations for T2-T3 services on APM (North side).

== Train formation ==
The configuration of a Crystal Mover in revenue service is just the one car. With both the motors and the third rail current collectors, the train cars can be coupled up to two or three cars during service.

== Signalling and operations ==
In the Changi Airport Skytrain, the signaling system and the automatic operation system utilise a train detection system based on the check-in/check-out principle, an ATC and an overrun protection system (ORP) by on-board ATP. When a train enters the ORP signal aspect section, the on-board ATP device creates the ORP control pattern in a manner which protects the fixed-point stop control pattern by the on-board ATO. If the train speed overshoots the ORP control pattern, the emergency brake is activated, safely bringing the train to an emergency stop.

The system also uses a by-pass operation between Terminals 2 and 3, where trains are placed under synchronous control so that they depart and arrive at each corresponding station at the same time. Specifically, the station departing times are synchronized by the count of the station dwell time which is automatically adjusted based on the stoppage state at the station. Also, the train speed is adjusted by ATO which recognizes signals which are sent from the way-side control devices to the on-board control device at the time of departure from a station so that the crossing times in the bypass section are optimized and their arrival times are synchronized.

== Redevelopment works ==
In 2015, one portion of the Changi Airport Skytrain system connecting Station B and E was suspended due to construction works for Jewel Changi Airport. Passengers in the public area had to use the mezzanine level bridge along Changi Airport MRT station, and the Skytrain operating between Station A and F in the airside. Landside operations for services between stations A and F only resumed in July 2019.

== Expansion ==
To increase the system capacity of the Skytrain, six new train cars have been purchased which subsequently entered service in 2019. The existing shuttle between Terminals 2 and 3 was upgraded to a three-car system, whereas the shuttle between Terminal 3 and 3 South was upgraded to a two-car system.

Terminal 4, opened in 2017, is not served by the Skytrain. However, the future Terminal 5 will also have an underground automated people mover system.
