= Fernvale, Singapore =

Fernvale
- Subzone of Sengkang Planning Area & Housing Estate

Name transcription(s)
  - Chinese: 芬维尔
  - Pinyin: fēnwéi'ěr
  - Malay: Fernvale
  - Tamil: ஃபொ்ன்வேல்
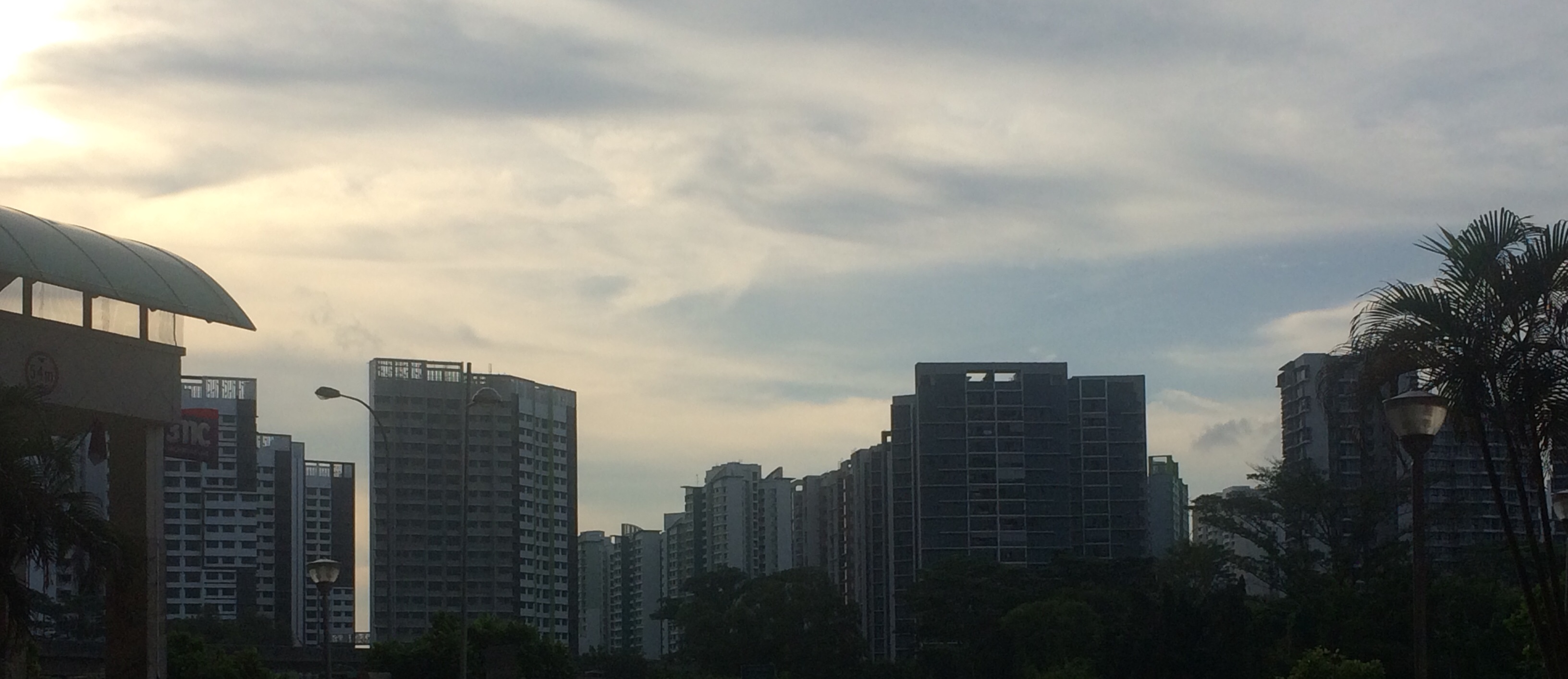
- Fernvale at dusk

- Location of Fernvale within Singapore
- Coordinates: 1°23′35.1″N 103°52′39.4″E
- Country: Singapore

Area
  - Total: 2.39 km^{2} (0.92 sq mi)

Population (2026)
  - Total: 71,050
  - Density: 29,700/km^{2} (77,000/sq mi)

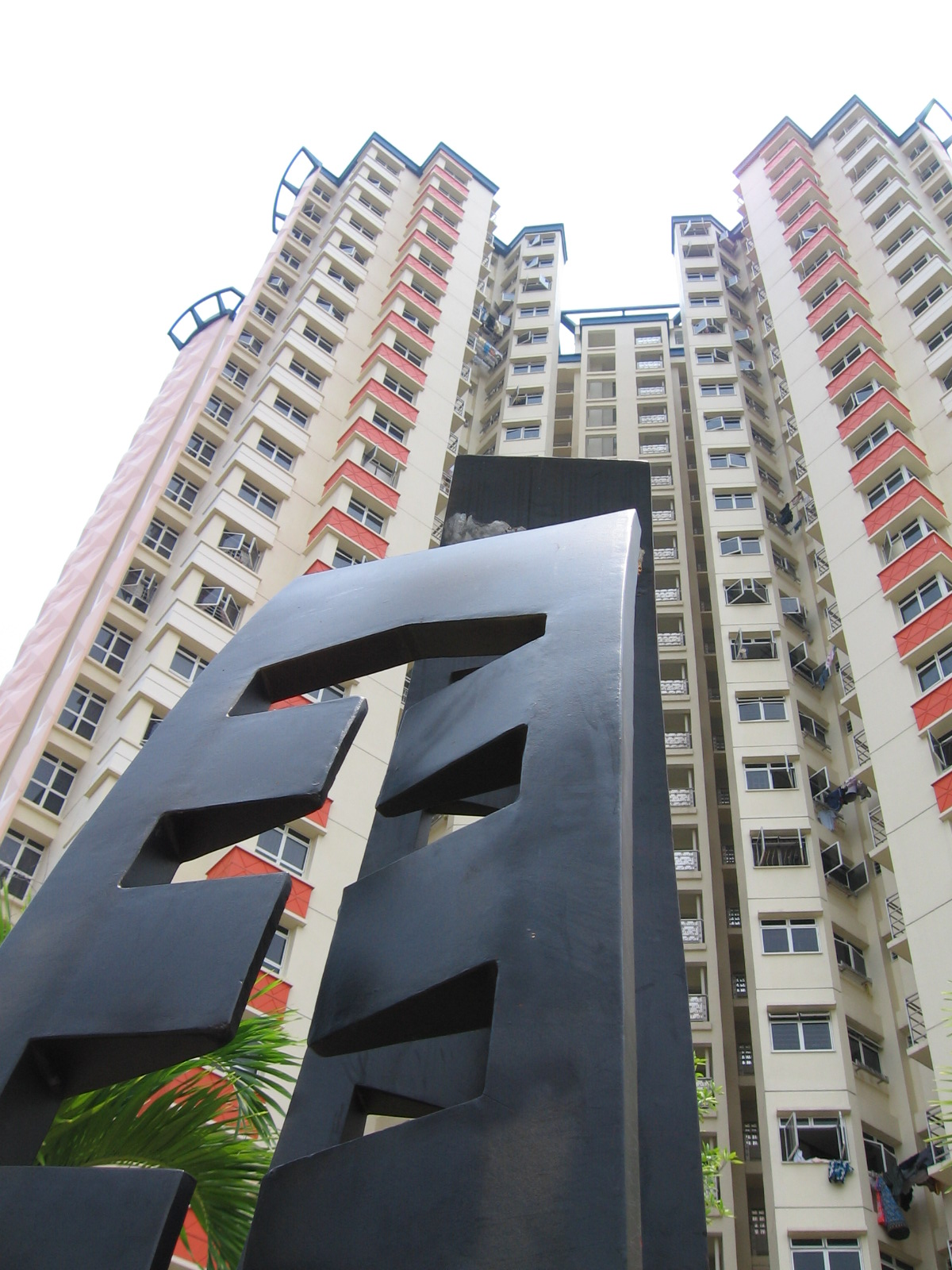
Coral Dew

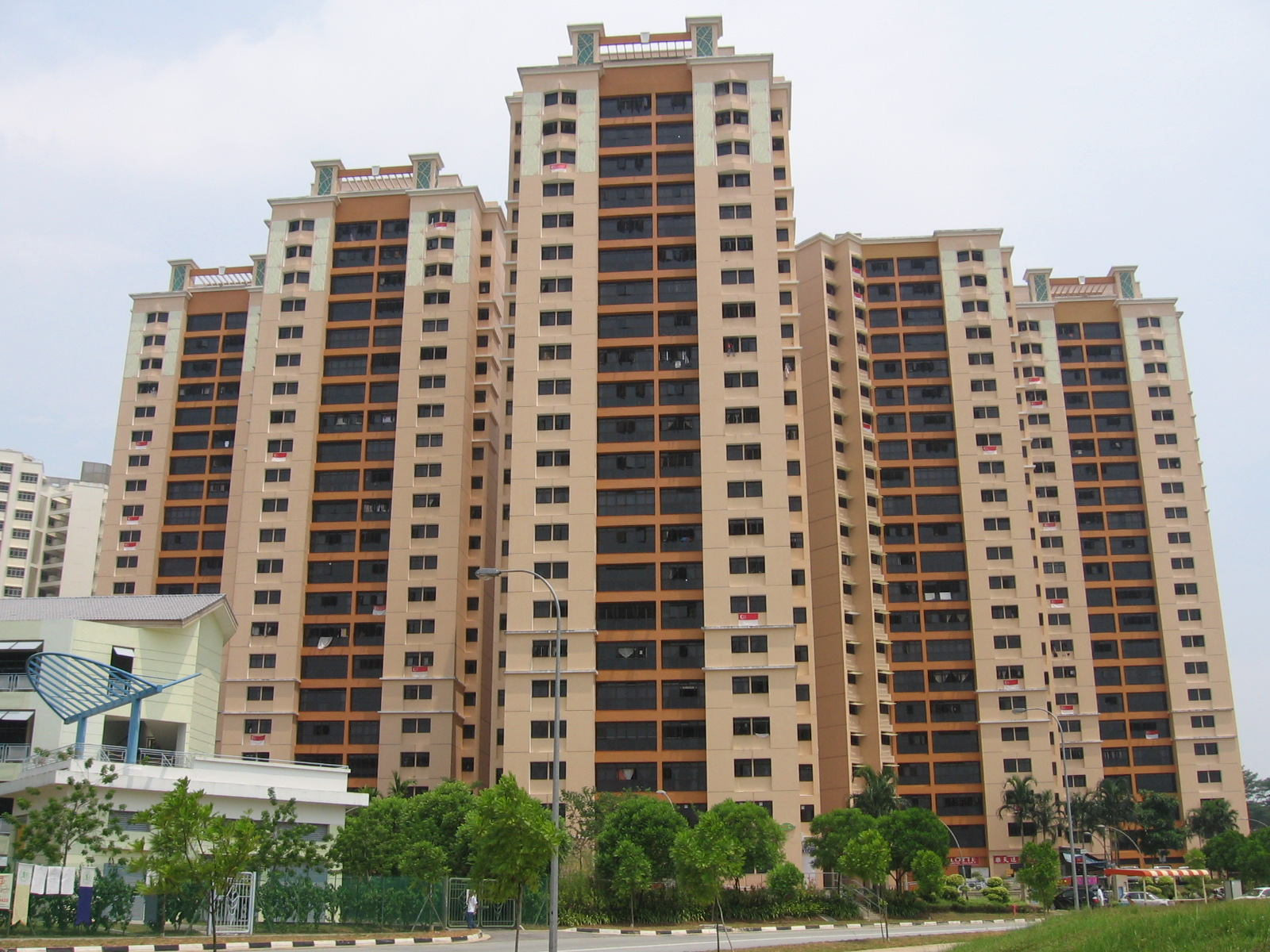
Fern Spring

Fernvale is a neighbourhood of Sengkang New Town in Singapore. It is located between Sungei Punggol and the proposed Sengkang West Industrial Estate. The house numbers of the public apartment blocks in Fernvale begin with the number '4' (4xx). Fernvale is the newest neighbourhood in Sengkang Town to be completed by the Housing and Development Board (HDB). Seletar Mall, a shopping amenity which housed Sengkang's first cineplex until 2024, is located within this neighbourhood. In 2017, a proposed community facility to be located next to Seletar Mall was announced, which houses a community club, childcare centre, hawker centre and wet market. The community facility which was slated to be ready by the second half of 2020, had stopped construction in April 2020 due to the COVID-19 measures set by the government. Construction of the facility has since continued in the second half of 2020 and was completed in 2022.

== Public Transport ==
Before 2003, the only way to go to Fernvale was Service 371 from Sengkang Bus Interchange. Now, the Fernvale neighbourhood is linked to the Sengkang Bus Interchange, Compassvale Bus Interchange and MRT/LRT Station at the town centre via bus services originating from the Sengkang Bus Interchange, Compassvale Bus Interchange and other parts of the island. The west loop of Sengkang LRT line also serves the area, passing by 4 stops located within the neighborhood (Layar, Fernvale, Thanggam and Kupang). The service 371 was later replaced by 163 and 163A (former 163M).

Bus service 85, which plies between Punggol and Yishun, was amended to serve Anchorvale and Fernvale to better serve residents living in Sengkang West, connecting them to Khatib MRT station in Yishun.

Bus service 86, which plies between Ang Mo Kio Bus Interchange and Sengkang Bus Interchange, connects residents to the Ang Mo Kio Industrial Park 3 along Yio Chu Kang Road, Yio Chu Kang MRT station, Ang Mo Kio Town Centre, the Seletar Camp Gate Transfer Hub and Rivervale.

Bus service 50, was introduced to ply between Bishan, Ang Mo Kio, Sengkang & Punggol neighbourhoods on 16 December 2012. The introduction of the service connects Punggol East, Sengkang East & West residents to Ang Mo Kio/Bishan Town where direct connectivity to those areas don't exist previously. It also serves as a faster alternative to Sengkang MRT/LRT station for Fernvale & Anchorvale (West) residents as compared to 163, complementing the LRT.

Bus service 103 has been extended from Seletar Airport to Yishun Bus Interchange to connect the workers in Seletar Aerospace Park to Yishun Town. It also serves as an alternative service to Yishun and Serangoon for Fernvale residents living very close to Jalan Kayu.

Bus service 102, which plies between Hougang Central Bus Interchange and Seletar Airport, connects Fernvale & Anchorvale residents to Jalan Kayu, Sengkang MRT/LRT station, Buangkok, the Seletar Aerospace Park/Airport and Hougang Town Centre.

Feeder bus service 374, was introduced to connect Sengkang Town Centre to Sengkang West via Anchorvale Crescent, looping at Fernvale Road outside Thanggam LRT station.

The area is within the vicinity of Jalan Kayu, the Gerald Mugliston Estate and the Greenwich V shopping centre located in the Seletar Hills area.

== Educational institutions ==
Primary schools

- Fernvale Primary School
- Sengkang Green Primary School
- Fern Green Primary School

Secondary schools

- Pei Hwa Secondary School

Special Education (SPED) schools

- Fernvale Gardens School

== Places of worship ==
Buddhist Temple

- Ubin Thai Buddhist Temple - part of Jalan Kayu Joint Temple

Chinese Temples

- Jalan Kayu Joint Temple
  - Bao Gong Temple
  - Man Kok Sua Chong Yee Temple
  - Leong Nam Temple
- Thye Hua Kwan Temple

Church

- Abundant Grace Presbyterian Church

== Shopping Amenities ==
- Seletar Mall

== Other Facilities ==
- Fernvale Community Club cum Hawker Centre and Wet Market
- Skool4Kidz Childcare Campus @ Fernvale
