= Seletar Camp =

Military facility in Singapore

- Seletar, North-East Region, Singapore

Site information
- Owner: Singapore Army
- Operator: 35th Battalion, Singapore Combat Engineers

Location
- Location within Singapore
- Coordinates: 1°24′46″N 103°52′34″E

Site history
- Built: 1928; 98 years ago
- Built for: Far East Air Force (Royal Air Force)

Garrison information
- Current commander: Lieutenant Colonel Katrina Pang

Seletar Camp is a military installation used by the Singapore Army. It is located in the northern part of Singapore by the Tampines Expressway and adjacent to Punggol Reservoir. Opposite is the newly built Seletar Airport.

== History ==
A large area that was once the entire Seletar Camp was first established for the British Royal Air Force and became fully operational by 1928. It was controlled by the Japanese during the Japanese occupation of Singapore from 1942 to 1945 and was used by the Imperial Japanese Navy's aviation units, besides serving as one of seven POW internment camps for captured British Indian Army personnel. After the war ended in 1945, it was once again controlled by the British until their withdrawal in 1971.

RAF Seletar was also on the premises of Seletar Camp. It was used by the Republic of Singapore Air Force after the British military's withdrawal as Seletar Air Base. Today, it is now a general-aviation civil airport known as Seletar Airport. It is adjacent to the current Seletar Camp operated by the Singapore Army. Parts of the former British-built Seletar Camp were gradually converted for civilian and other ordinary use, with the original camp's land considerably shrinking in size. It was the home of the Command and Staff College between 1982 and 1995 before it moved to its current and permanent location at SAFTI Military Institute in Jurong.

Seletar Camp was also where hundreds of houses that served as quarters for RAF and British military personnel were located. Many of the houses have been retained and are still occupied. Popularly known as "black and whites" due to their striking colours, they are owned by the Singapore government and are available for lease. After the RAF's departure, the Republic of Singapore Air Force's 160 Anti- Aircraft Gunners was formerly stationed at Seletar Camp but has since shifted operations to Chong Pang Camp in 2002. A small golf course and the newly established Seletar Aerospace Park are also on the former grounds of Seletar Camp.

To free up land for future redevelopment, the Army Combat Engineers Group and its sub-units were consolidated into a 30-hectare site and the camp's main gate was relocated to St. Martin Lane. In June 2012, DSTA completed the development of the site and achieved significant intensification through meticulous planning. The result was the consolidation of administrative, training, maintenance and recreational facilities, as well as the accommodation which was originally housed in smaller low-rise buildings. To minimise the number of buildings, facilities with strong functional relationships and compatible building functions were housed together, with 170 old buildings together with the old Medical Centre consolidated into 25 new multi-storey facilities. These are spread along the original eastern edge of the old Seletar Camp. The camp's area at present has been reduced to 30 hectares. Seletar Camp once housed many SAF combat engineer units.

On 4 April 2019, the 39th Battalion Singapore Combat Engineers (39SCE), 36th Battalion Singapore Combat Engineers (36SCE), CBRE Engineers Training Centre (CETC) & HQ Chemical, Biological, Radiological and Explosive Defence Group (CBRE DG) closed down their operations in Seletar and shifted all operations to Nee Soon Camp (this includes the canteen and cookhouse facilities inside the camp) except the Seletar Camp Medical Centre which did not shift its operations together to Nee Soon Camp. This frees up space for additional developments in Seletar Camp and is being reserved for the new Aerospace Hub. Today, only the 35th Battalion Singapore Combat Engineers (35SCE), HQ Army Combat Engineers Group (HQ ARMCEG) and the Seletar Camp Medical Centre are still operating at the current camp.

On 1 June 2020, during the COVID-19 pandemic in Singapore, the Singapore Army announced that Seletar East Camp will be converted into a temporary housing for migrant workers.
