= Jalan Kayu =

Name transcription(s)
  - Chinese: 惹兰加由
  - Pinyin: Rělán Jiāyóu
  - Malay: Jalan Kayu
  - Tamil: ஜலன் காயு
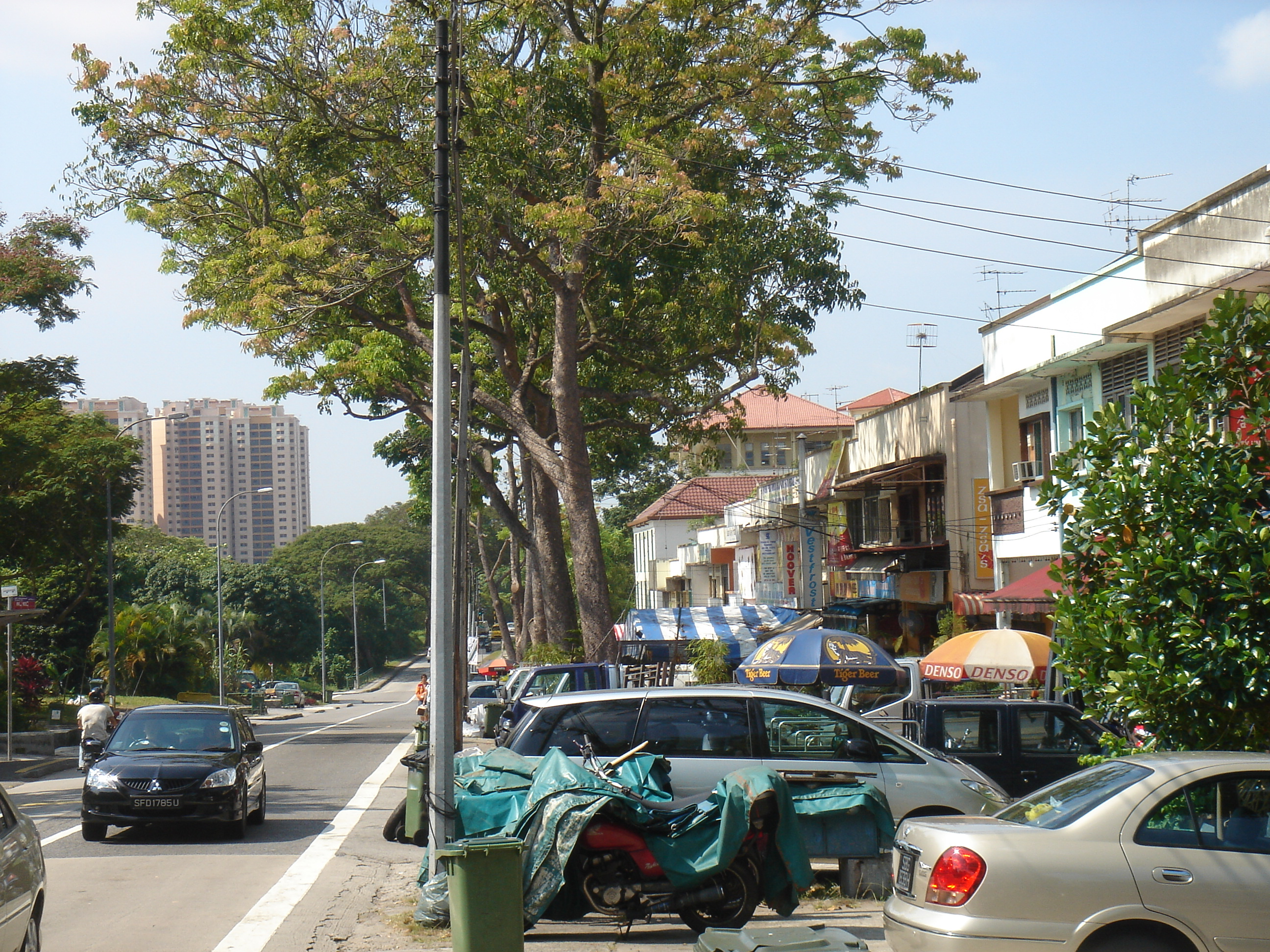
- Row of shophouses along Jalan Kayu

- Location of Jalan Kayu within Singapore
- Coordinates: 1°23′48.3″N 103°52′23.1″E
- Country: Singapore

Jalan Kayu is a road situated in Sengkang, Singapore. It is located in the northwestern part of Fernvale, near the Seletar–Sengkang boundary.

== Etymology and history ==
Jalan Kayu was built in 1928 when the first Royal Air Force base outside the United Kingdom was established in Singapore, in the northern part of the island. It was initially known as Air Base Road, but its name was changed to the current name by the Royal Air Force in 1937. The reason for the name change was unknown, but it was proposed that it was named after their former chief engineer C.E.O Wood, as Kayu is Malay for wood.

In 1951, ownership of the road was turned over from the Air Ministry to the Singapore Rural Board, with the Royal Air Force providing 50 percent of the funds for making up the road.

== Jalan Kayu today ==
The street itself is a relatively minor, two-lane road. However, it became prominent in Singapore for two reasons. Firstly, it was the main access route to the large British-built military compound in Seletar as well as the neighbouring Seletar Airport. Secondly, a range of road-side eateries selling roti prata gradually earned a reputation among the people of Singapore as arguably amongst the best in Singapore, and the road name became a household name for good food in a laid-back setting.

A small section of Jalan Kayu between Yio Chu Kang Road and Sengkang West Avenue was closed on 13 October 2013, to make way for the development of the Seletar Aerospace Park, as well as for the construction of Sengkang West Road. The construction of Sengkang West Road was part of the road interchange for the Seletar Aerospace Park and future Sengkang Industrial Estate, as the existing Jalan Kayu could not support the traffic demands from the future developments.

Another short section of Jalan Kayu, between Seletar West Farmway 4 and Sengkang West Way was widened from a one-lane road to a two-lane road to further ease traffic congestion. New traffic signals were installed as well. On 14 May 2017, construction of an extension of Sengkang West Way to Sengkang West Road was completed, turning the 3-way junction of Jalan Kayu and Sengkang West Way to a four-way one, connecting Jalan Kayu and Sengkang West Road while connectivity between Sengkang West area and Tampines Expressway (TPE) was improved.

The southern portion of the road (after the junction with Sengkang West Way) is now home to new HDB housing estates of the Fernvale neighborhood.
