= EHQ =

EHQ may refer to:

- Shortening of Embarkation Headquarters, an Indian football team that competed in the 1945–46 Santosh Trophy
- EHQ, publisher of Command Decision following its publication by Game Designers' Workshop
- European Hospitality Quality, a system of hotel rating
- Engineer Headquarters, part of Sentosa Island
- Engineer Headquarters, part of Singapore Combat Engineers
