= Seletar =

- Planning area and regional centre

Other transcription(s)
  - Malay: Seletar (Rumi) سلتار (Jawi)
  - Chinese: 实里达 (Simplified) 實里達 (Traditional); Shílǐdá (Pinyin); Si̍t-lí-ta̍t (Hokkien POJ)
  - Tamil: சிலேத்தார் Cilēttār (Transliteration)
- Location of Seletar in Singapore

- Location of Seletar within Singapore
- Coordinates: 1°24′19.2″N 103°51′58.6″E
- Country: Singapore
- Region: North-East Region
- CDC: Central Singapore CDC
- Town councils: Jalan Kayu Town Council
- Constituency: Jalan Kayu SMC

Government
  - Mayor: Central Singapore CDC: Denise Phua
  - Members of Parliament: Jalan Kayu SMC: Ng Chee Meng

Area
  - Total: 10.25 km^{2} (3.96 sq mi)
  - Residential: 10.85 km^{2} (4.19 sq mi)

Population (2026)
  - Total: 300
  - Density: 29/km^{2} (76/sq mi)
- Demonym: Official: Seletar resident
- Postal district: 28

Seletar (/səˈliːtɑːr/ sə-LEE-tar) is the regional centre of the North-East Region of Singapore. The place name was derived from the Malay subgroup who were indigenous to the area, the Orang Seletar. It shares boundaries with the planning areas of Sengkang to the south, Punggol to the east, Yishun and Simpang to the west, as well as the Straits of Johor to the north.

Formerly a Royal Air Force (RAF) military airbase site, the area now houses the Seletar Aerospace Park. The aerospace park houses industries specialising in aircraft maintenance and repair services. Despite its status as a regional centre, the area remains relatively rural in a local context, with more residential and commercial developments being constructed in the neighbouring planning area of Punggol. There remains future plans to transform Seletar into one of Singapore's regional centres, along with Jurong East, Tampines and Woodlands.

== Geography ==
=== Geographical extent ===
According to the book Down the Seletar River: Discovering a Hidden Treasure of Singapore, Seletar generally refers to a region defined by the Ponggol River to the east, the Seletar River to the west, Ang Mo Kio to the south and the Straits of Johore to the north. It includes the areas covering Yio Chu Kang, Jalan Kayu, Lower Seletar Reservoir and a part of Upper Thomson.

=== Seletar Planning Area ===
Seletar Planning Area, as defined by the Urban Redevelopment Authority, shares a land boundary with planning areas of Sengkang to the south, riverine boundaries with Punggol to the east and Yishun to the west. Its northern boundary is made up by the Straits of Johor. Seletar Planning Area is officially divided into 4 subzones – Seletar, Seletar Aerospace Park, Pulau Punggol Barat and Pulau Punggol Timor.

=== Political boundaries ===
Seletar previously existed as an independent constituency of its own back in the 1951 election before being renamed into the permanent name of Jalan Kayu Constituency beginning in 1959. In 1988, Jalan Kayu was merged into Cheng San GRC, then merged with Ang Mo Kio GRC in 2001 after Cheng San GRC was dissolved. Jalan Kayu was separated from Ang Mo Kio GRC into a SMC in the 2025 elections, which covers the entirety of Seletar planning area, as well as Jalan Kayu and Fernvale. The SMC's MP was former Republic of Singapore Air Force major-general Ng Chee Meng, who is presently both the secretary-general of National Trades Union Congress and Minister Without Portfolio.

== History ==
The area was home to the indigenous Malay population, especially the Orang Seletar (Malay for Seletar people) - a subgroup of Malay sea gypsies living on the waters of the island. There were already hundreds of them even before the arrival of Raffles. Seletar was originally a rubber plantation estate owned and managed by the Singapore United Rubber Plantations Ltd. In 1923, the Straits Settlement government bought 600 acres (2.4 km^{2}) from the Singapore United Rubber Plantations Ltd and gave it to the British Royal Air Force as a site for its military air base in Singapore. Construction of the airfield was completed in 1929 and it was officially opened in 1930. The airfield was the first RAF base east of India and had also served as a civilian airport until 1937, when Kallang Airport was opened to the public.

The Seletar Reservoir (now known as Upper Seletar Reservoir), was first built in 1920, after the First World War to cope with the water demand in Singapore. It was marked as a conservation site in August 1999.

The area is also dotted with colonial bungalows that were built for the military personnel of the RAF, which still stands today. In 2007, the government announced that some 174 bungalows has been set aside for demolition to make way for the new Seletar Aerospace Park, while the remaining 204 bungalows will be retained and some of these units will be converted into aerospace training schools and food and beverage outlets, while 131 units will be set aside for residential use.

== See also ==
- Seletar Airport

== Sources ==
- Victor R Savage, Brenda S A Yeoh (2003), Toponymics – A Study of Singapore Street Names, Eastern Universities Press, ISBN 981-210-205-1
