= Seletar Mall =

The Seletar Mall
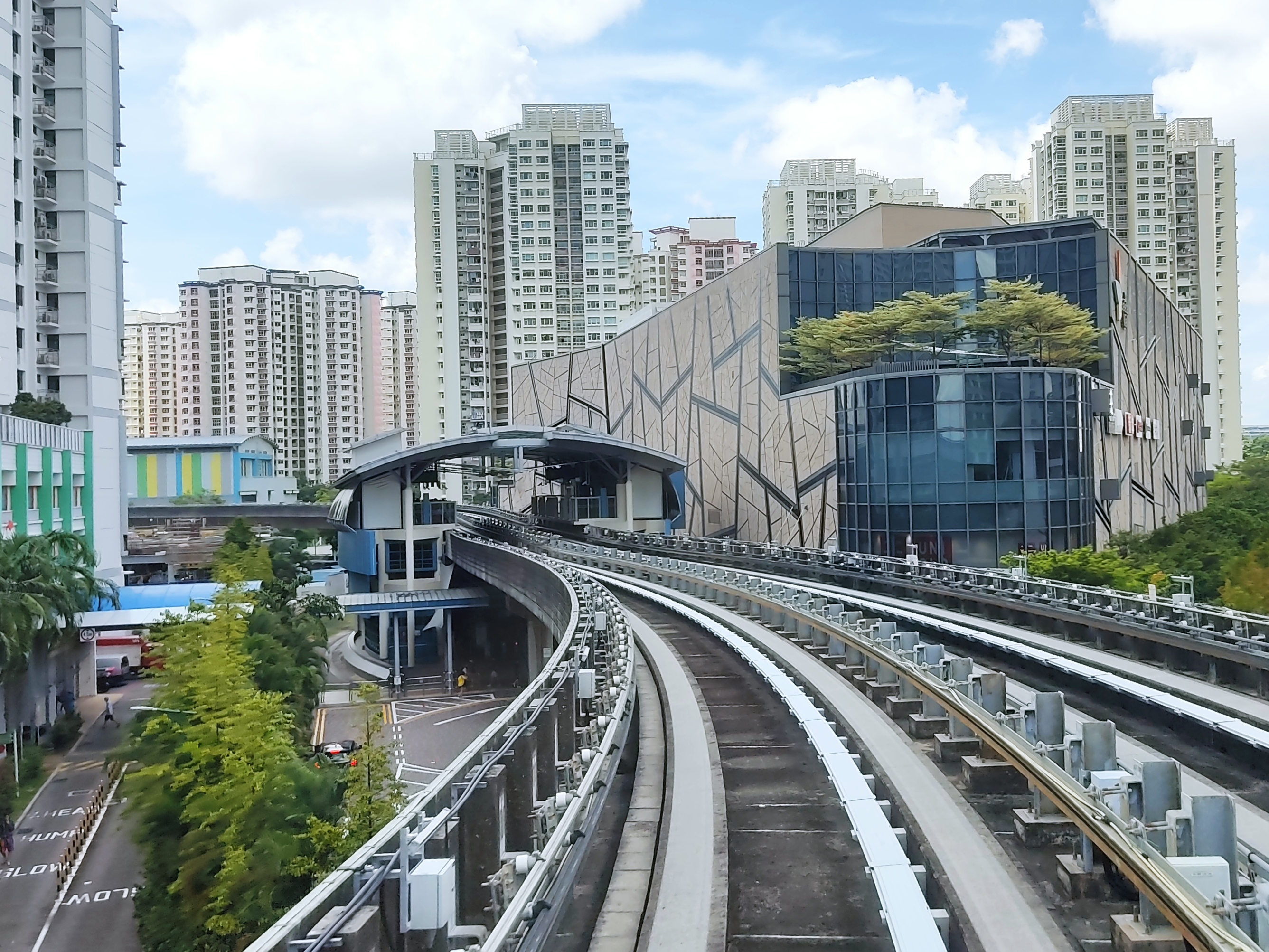
- Seletar Mall as seen from an LRT
- Location: Fernvale, Singapore
- Coordinates: 1.3917°N 103.8760°E
- Address: 33 Sengkang West Avenue, Singapore 797653
- Opened: 28 November 2014; 11 years ago
- Manager: The Seletar Mall Pte. Ltd
- Owner: Allgreen Properties Limited
- Num. of stores: 132
- Num. of anchor tenants: 6
- Floor area: 188,000 square feet (17,500 m^{2})
- Floors: 6
- Parking: 384
- Public transit: SW5 Fernvale
- Website: www.theseletarmall.com.sg

The Seletar Mall (Chinese: 利达广场) is a suburban shopping mall located in Fernvale, Singapore, next to Fernvale LRT station. Construction of the mall started in late 2012 and was opened in November 2014.

== History ==
The Seletar Mall was developed as a joint venture by SPH Properties (now Cuscaden Peak Investments) and United Engineers and was completed in November 2014. It had its official opening in May 2015 by then Minister of State Dr Lam Pin Min. A unique triangular-shaped mall, it had a Shaw Theatres cinema, a BHG department store, an NTUC Foodfare food court, a Fairprice Finest supermarket, an Amore Fitness spa and gym, supplemented by more than 130 speciality shops.

The food court was replaced by Haidilao Hotpot shortly after the neighbouring hawker centre opened in 2022, while BHG was replaced by Harvey Norman in early 2023.

In 2024, the property was sold to Allgreen Properties Ltd, a division of the Kuok Group.

As part of asset enhancement works, the cinema was shuttered in December that year due to low patronage at the end of its lease, and has since been replaced by karaoke chain HaveFun KTV, children's play area Sunshine Childhood Playland (relocated from its former premise at Level 3), and amusement centre Cow Play Cow Moo. All three tenants will open by January 2026. In addition, the basement levels were also reconfigured and refurbished to serve shoppers better as well.
