= Sengkang LRT line =

Light rail line in Singapore

Sengkang LRT

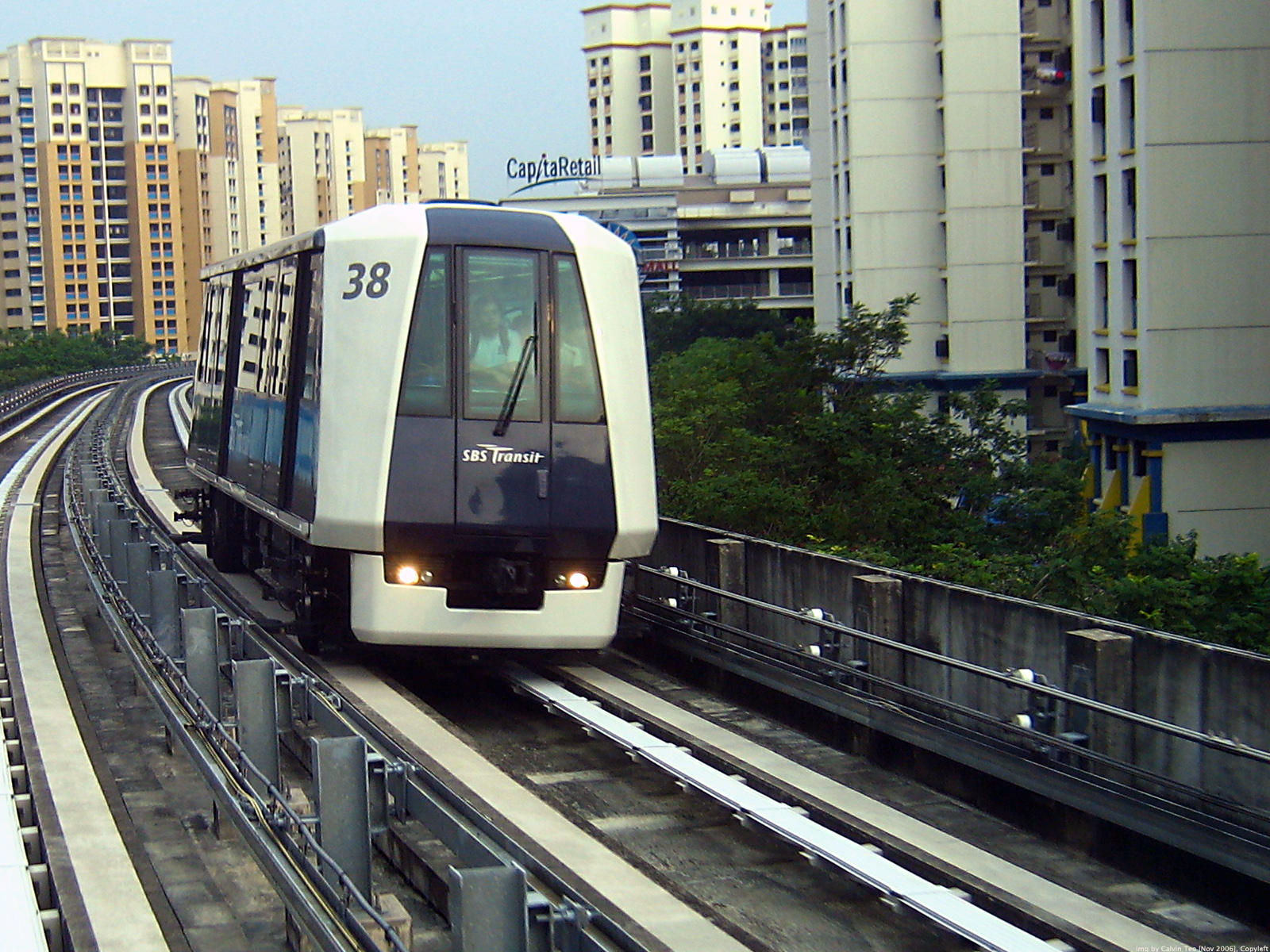
- A Mitsubishi Crystal Mover Automated People Mover on the Sengkang LRT Line

Overview
- Native name: Malay: Laluan LRT Sengkang; Chinese: 盛港轻轨线; Tamil: செங்காங் லைட் ரெயில் வரி
- Status: Operational
- Owner: Land Transport Authority
- Locale: Sengkang, North-East Region, Singapore
- Termini: Sengkang
- Stations: 14

Service
- Type: Automated guideway transit/People mover
- System: Light Rail Transit
- Services: 4
- Operator: SBS Transit Ltd
- Depot: Sengkang
- Rolling stock: Mitsubishi Heavy Industries Crystal Mover (C810, C810A, C810D)
- Daily ridership: 27,541 (July 2020)

History
- Opened: 18 January 2003; 23 years ago (East Loop); 29 January 2005; 21 years ago (West Loop); 15 November 2007; 19 years ago (Farmway station); 1 January 2013; 13 years ago (Cheng Lim station); 27 June 2015; 11 years ago (Kupang station)

Technical
- Line length: 10.7 km (6.6 mi)
- Character: Fully-elevated
- Track gauge: 1,850 mm (6 ft 27/32 in); Guideway span: 3.2 m (10 ft 6 in)
- Electrification: 750 V DC third rail
- Operating speed: 70 km/h (43 mph)
- Signalling: Kyosan Electric APM fixed block system
Route map
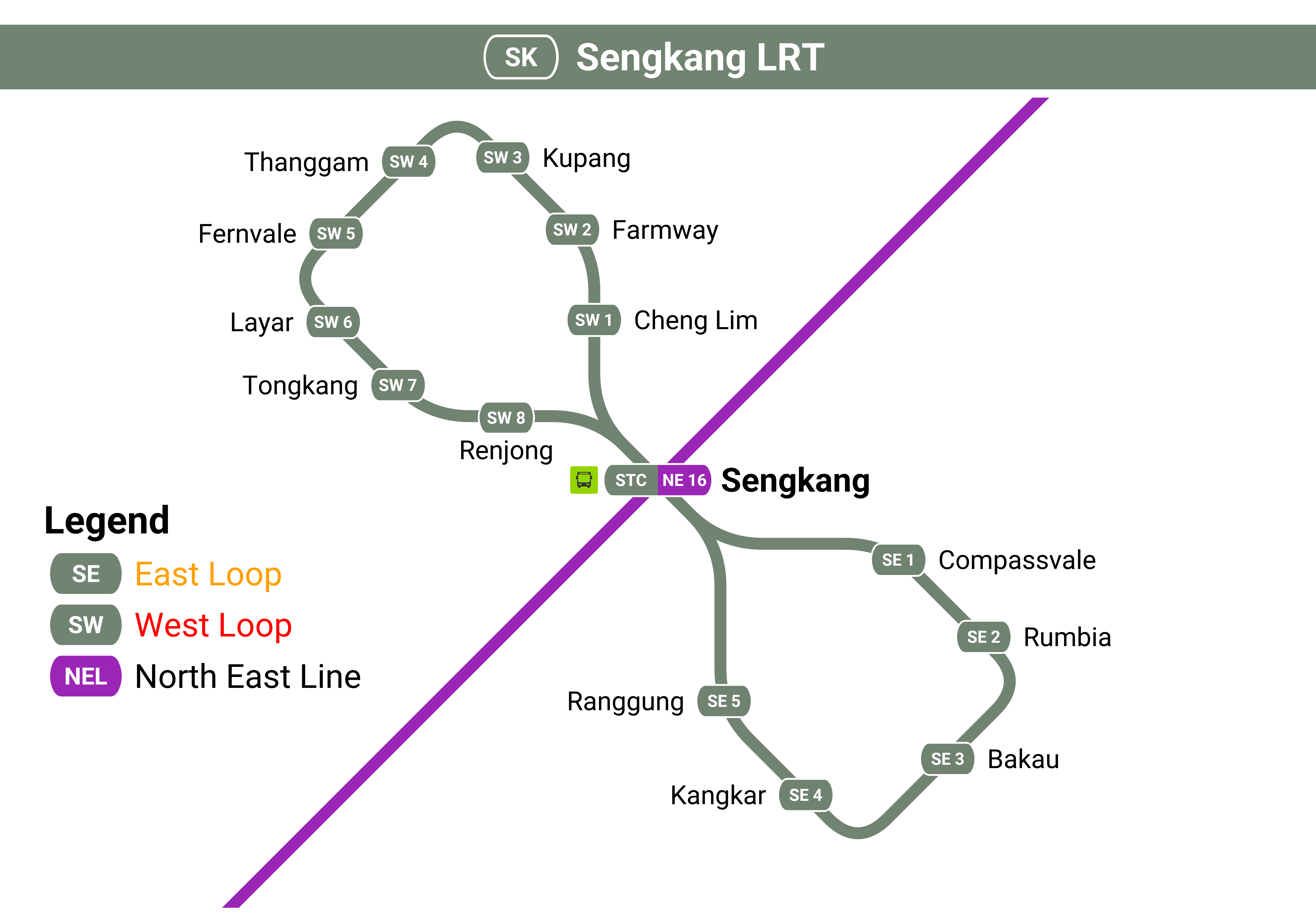

The Sengkang LRT line (SKLRT) is a 10.7-kilometre (6.6 mi) elevated automated guideway transit line in Sengkang, Singapore. The driverless line consists of 14 stations on two loops, with Sengkang station serving as the interchange for both loops and linking to the North East Line on the Mass Rapid Transit system. It is the second Light Rail Transit (LRT) line in Singapore after the Bukit Panjang LRT line, and the first LRT line operated by SBS Transit.

The SKLRT was planned in tandem with the development of the Sengkang estate in the 1990s. Construction of the LRT stations and viaducts was completed in 2001, and the Land Transport Authority transferred operations to SBS Transit in September 2002. The east loop began operations on 18 January 2003, followed by the west loop on 29 January 2005, with Kupang station being the last to open on 27 June 2015.

The line operates using Kyosan Electric's Automated People Mover (APM) fixed block signalling system and Mitsubishi Heavy Industries' Crystal Mover APM cars. The SKLRT initially ran single-car operations until it was upgraded for two-car operations in December 2015 to accommodate increased ridership. Between 2018 and 2022, the SKLRT underwent further renewal works to improve its reliability. A new fleet of 33 two-car APMs have entered service since 15 July 2025 with more sets to be introduced until 2030, progressively replacing 25 one-car trains and half of the 16 two-car trains in the existing fleet.

== History ==
=== Planning and construction ===
The Sengkang estate was first earmarked for development in the Urban Redevelopment Authority's 1991 Concept Plan. At the groundbreaking ceremony of the Bukit Panjang LRT line on 27 September 1996, deputy prime minister Tony Tan announced the government's decision to construct the Sengkang LRT (SKLRT). The line would be developed alongside the Sengkang estate and integrated with future developments, intended to improve accessibility and convenience for residents. An exhibition for the SKLRT opened on 7 December 1996 in Ngee Ann City. At the time, according to communications minister Mah Bow Tan, the SKLRT was planned to be completed in 2002.

The contract for the design and construction of the Sengkang and Punggol LRT lines was awarded to a joint venture on 4 July 1998 for S$656 million (US$392 million). The joint venture comprised Singapore Technologies Industrial Corporation (predecessor of Sembcorp), Mitsubishi Heavy Industries and Mitsubishi Corporation. On 20 May 1999, Singapore Bus Service (later renamed SBS Transit) was appointed to operate the SKLRT along with the North East Line and the Punggol LRT line.

Construction of the SKLRT stations and viaducts was completed in 2001. In December of that year, subcontractor BRR Holdings withdrew from the LRT project due to financial difficulties, and handed over its responsibilities to SembCorp Engineers and Constructors. According to Singapore's transport agency – the Land Transport Authority (LTA), the withdrawal had minimal impact on the construction schedule.

On 1 September 2002, the LTA transferred operations of the SKLRT to SBS Transit, which conducted extensive test runs and trials on the line. This came in light of frequent delays and breakdowns experienced on the Bukit Panjang LRT. In December 2002, transport minister Yeo Cheow Tong said the opening of the SKLRT would be delayed due to modifications required for the communication and radio systems. Due to limited funding from the 1997 financial crisis and low projected ridership, the Sengkang LRT line was initially constructed for single-car operations, even though it had been designed for two. Nevertheless, provisions were made for future upgrades to two-car operations during the expected equipment replacement cycle within 15 to 20 years.

=== Opening ===
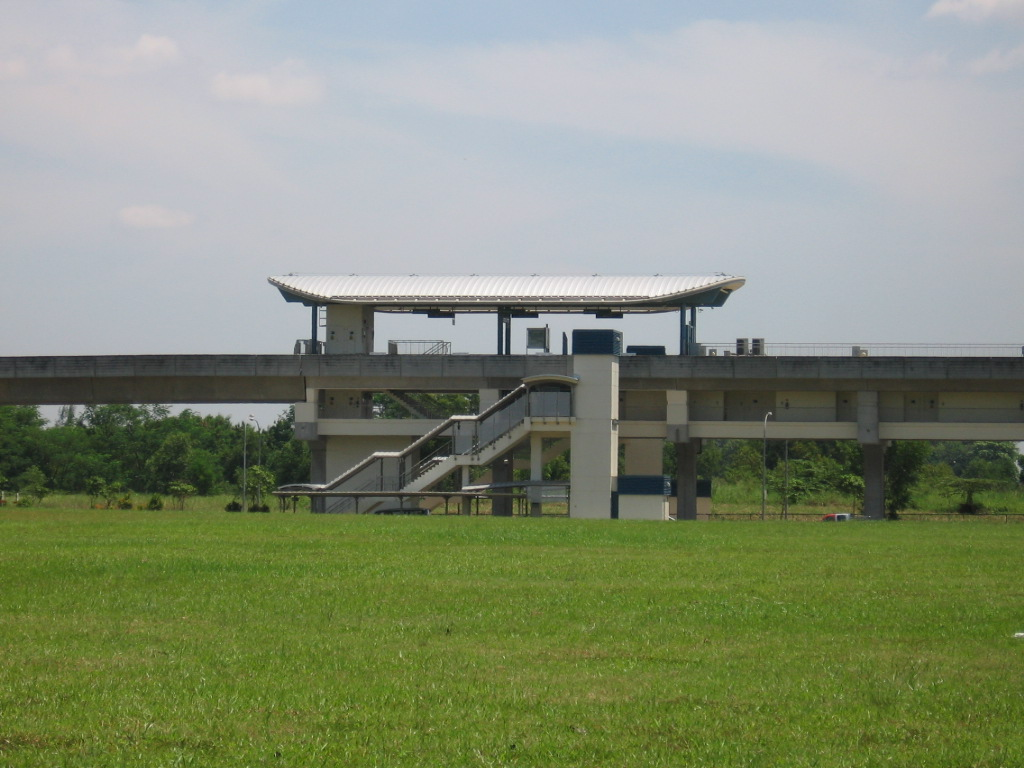
Cheng Lim station in September 2005. Due to the lack of surrounding developments, the station only opened in 2013.

Sengkang LRT line stations timeline
Date	Project	Description
18 January 2003	East Loop	Opening of the East Loop
29 January 2005	West Loop	West Loop (except for Cheng Lim, Farmway and Kupang) opened in uni-directional manner.
15 November 2007	West Loop	Farmway opened for passenger service.
4 January 2010	West Loop	West Loop operated in both directions during the morning and evening peak hours on weekdays.
1 January 2013	West Loop	Bidirectional services on the West Loop commenced throughout the day and Cheng Lim was opened for passenger service.
27 June 2015	West Loop	Kupang opened for passenger service.

The east loop commenced operations on 18 January 2003, offering free rides during its first two days. At the time, 90% of Sengkang residents lived along the east loop, while the west remained largely undeveloped. Operations began at 1:30 pm to accommodate the queue of the 100 waiting commuters. The initial fare on the SKLRT was S$0.64 per trip (US$0.48). The system experienced its first breakdown on 5 September that year because of a computer failure. In October 2004, Today reported that the SKLRT was operating at a loss due to low ridership, as only 37,000 of the projected 95,000 public flats had been completed.

With the exception of the Farmway, Cheng Lim, and Kupang stations, the west loop commenced operations on 29 January 2005. To mark the commencement of the west loop, Wee Siew Kim, Adviser to Jalan Kayu Grassroots Organisations, officiated the opening of the bridge linking Thanggam Station to Jalan Kayu via Lorong Samak. The west loop initially operated unidirectional services in the peak flow direction. Morning services from 5:20 am to 3:00 pm ran anti-clockwise from Thanggam to Renjong, while evening services from 3:00 pm to 12:35 am ran clockwise from Renjong to Thanggam.

Farmway station opened on 15 November 2007 to serve the Anchorvale Community Club and surrounding housing developments. On 4 January 2010, the west loop commenced bidirectional services only on weekday peak hours from 6:45 am to 9:00 am and from 6:15 pm to 8:30 pm. Full-day bidirectional services on the west loop began on 1 January 2013 with the opening of Cheng Lim station. Kupang station opened on 27 June 2015 to cater to new residential developments in its vicinity. Daily ridership on the SKLRT at the time had reached 60,000.

A power trip caused a two-hour disruption on the evening of 1 June 2016. On 16 February 2018, a dislodged power collector shoe caused a train to stall near Sengkang station. On 9 June 2024, the signalling system's power supply failed during upgrading works. As a result, no trains could be launched on that morning, with services only resuming at 10:12 am.

=== Upgrades ===
On 31 October 2012, the LTA announced plans to increase passenger capacity of the Sengkang and Punggol LRT lines (SPLRT) to cater to increased ridership on the SPLRT. According to SBS Transit, daily ridership had reached 73,000. The Straits Times reported in September that the LTA had completed engineering studies for upgrading the system from one-car to two-car operations. The upgrading works involved retrofitting 16 of the 41 one-car trains for two-car operations while purchasing 16 additional cars. Two-car operations on the SKLRT began on 22 December 2015, with an official ceremony held on 5 January 2016. However, in October 2024, Jamus Lim, a Member of Parliament (MP) for Sengkang Group Representation Constituency, highlighted commuter concerns about inconsistent train frequencies and the irregular use of two-car trains during peak hours.

On 15 December 2017, the LTA outlined a renewal programme to improve operational reliability on the SPLRT. These works included power rail and signalling maintenance, along with reinforcing viaduct crossheads and replacing bearings after cracks were found during inspections. The maintenance works took place on selected Sunday mornings from 14 January to 25 February 2018, during which the affected loops operated unidirectional services. Unidirectional services continued on Sunday mornings from 4 March to 29 April due to extended maintenance works involving power rail replacements and preventive maintenance on signalling cables. Rectification works on the concrete plinths and elevated slabs were conducted on Sunday evenings between 27 May and 7 October. Maintenance works during service hours continued in 2020, 2021, and 2022. Although these works were originally scheduled for completion in 2022, the LTA announced in 2021 that the renewal had been delayed due to the impact of the COVID-19 pandemic.

Plans to refurbish Sengkang station was announced in May 2018. The upgrades included expanding the LRT platform and installing new dual-speed escalators and a new lift to connect the platforms, concourse and mezzanine levels of the station. New signs and queue markings were introduced on the platform to indicate new stopping points for each of the four LRT routes plying the station. The refurbished LRT platforms began operations at the end of September 2024.

On 5 February 2021, the LTA said they would purchase 17 two-car trains for the SPLRT, which were expected to be delivered from 2024 to 2027. The 3.5 ha (8.6-acre) Sengkang Depot would also be expanded to 11.1 ha (27.4 acres) to increase capacity and maintenance space for the new trains. The depot expansion also included two new reception tracks to reduce train launching time. In February 2022, the contract for the depot expansion was awarded to Sato Kogyo (S) Pte Ltd for S$157 million (US$117.2 million), and the contract for the new fleet of trains was awarded to Mitsubishi Corporation for S$439 million (US$327.6 million). The new trains entered service on 15 July 2025. To allow the reception tracks to be connected to the depot, it was planned that train service on the West Loop would only operate along the Outer Loop from 19 April to 18 October 2026. Shuttle bus services were provided for affected commuters, and the Outer Loop only used two-car trains to maximise capacity. On 4 October 2026, services resumed on the Inner Loop, 2 weeks ahead of schedule.

== Network and operations ==
=== Route and service ===
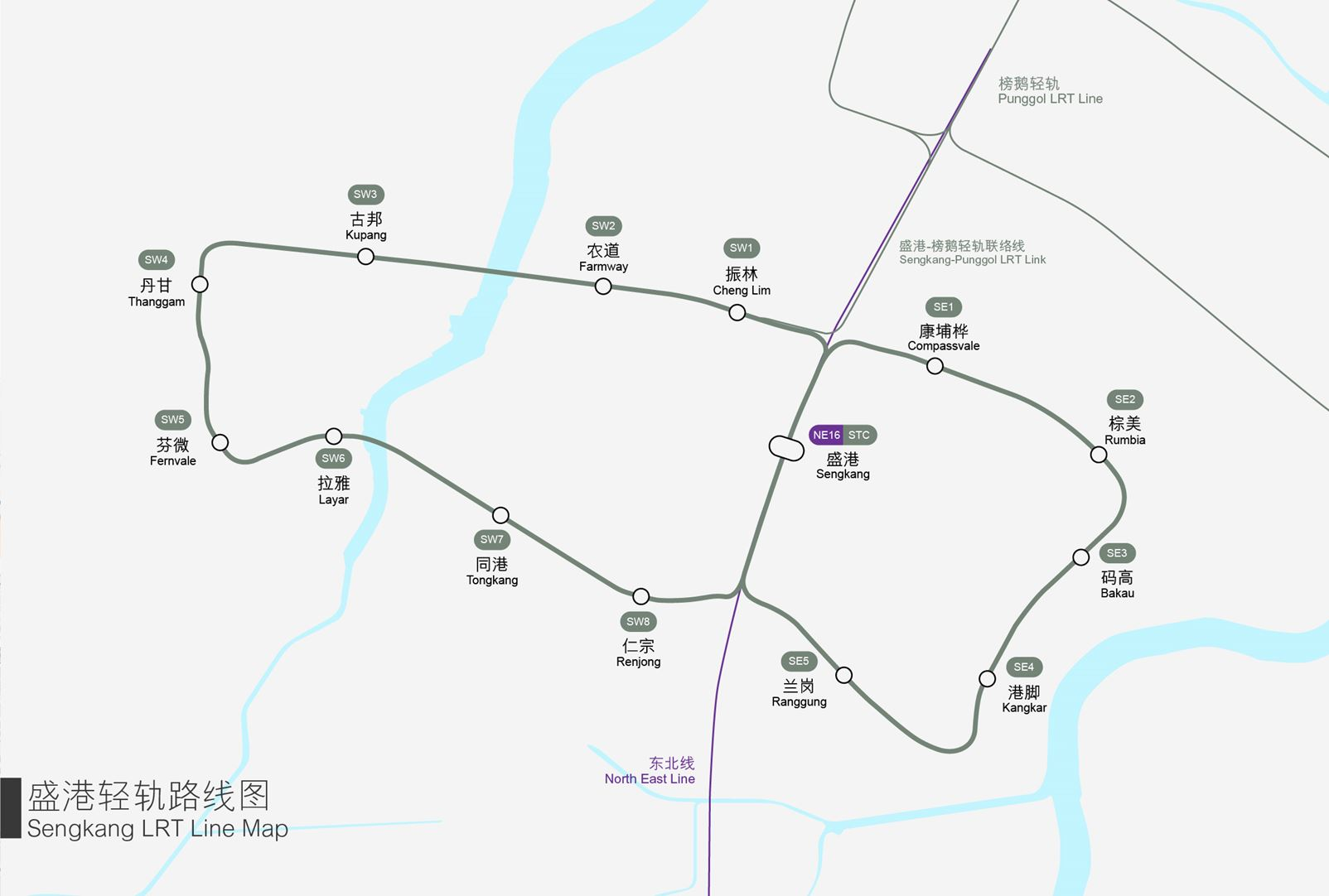
Geographic route map of Sengkang LRT

The Sengkang LRT (SKLRT) is a fully elevated automated guideway transit line, (Note: Also called an "Automated People Mover" (APM) by Mitsubishi.) with a route length of 10.7 kilometres (6.6 miles). It is coloured grey on official maps. On dynamic passenger information displays and static signs on the platforms, yellow indicates the east loop, and red indicates the west loop. The SKLRT has four routes operating on two bi-directional loops that converge at Sengkang station. The line generally runs along road medians, with an average viaduct height of 15 metres (49 ft).

On the east loop, the line heads north after Sengkang station before curving eastward and running along the medians of Compassvale Street and Rivervale Drive. After passing Rumbia station, it turns south along Rivervale Drive, then west along Sengkang East Avenue, completing the loop by heading north back to Sengkang station. On the west loop, the line from Sengkang station diverges west toward Cheng Lim station. A spur connects the SKLRT to the Punggol LRT line across the Tampines Expressway. The SKLRT continues along Anchorvale Street and Fernvale Street. Between the Farmway and Kupang stations, the line crosses Sungei Punggol. After Kupang station, the line turns south along Fernvale Road, and turns east along Sengkang West Avenue. It crosses Sungei Punggol again between Layar and Tongkang stations, with reception tracks connecting the line to Sengkang Depot. Following Renjong station, the line completes the loop by heading north back to Sengkang station.

The line operates between 5:18 am (5:38 am on Sundays and public holidays) and 12:37 am daily. The SKLRT is operated by SBS Transit. Since 2018, the SKLRT has been part of the New Rail Financing Framework (NRFF). Previously, the operator (the owner of the rail assets) had to bear the cost of maintaining and upgrading trains and signalling. Under the NRFF, the LTA and SBS Transit share the profits and financial risks in operating the line and the LTA will take control of its operating assets on 1 April 2033. SBS Transit operates the line under a 15-year licence which will expire on 31 March 2033. To ease the morning crowds riding on the NEL, from 27 December 2025, free fares apply to those tapping in at any of the stations on the SKLRT on weekday mornings before 7.30 am, or between 9 am and 9.45 am.

=== Stations ===
The east loop has five stations, while the west loop has eight stations. The average distance between stations is 300 metres (980 ft), with each station positioned to serve residents within a 400-metre (1,300 ft) radius.

Station code	Station name	Images	Opening	Further information	Location(s)
STC NE16	Sengkang	View of Sengkang LRT platform	18 January 2003; 23 years ago	Interchange with the North East Line . Close to Sengkang Bus Interchange and Compassvale Bus Interchange.	1°23′30″N 103°53′42″E
East loop
SE1	Compassvale	View of Compassvale LRT platforms	18 January 2003; 23 years ago	N/A	1°23′40″N 103°54′01″E
SE2	Rumbia	View of Rumbia LRT platforms	18 January 2003; 23 years ago	Named after the plants Sagu Rumbia and Buah Rumbia.	1°23′27.94″N 103°54′22.70″E
SE3	Bakau	An entrance to the station along the road. A flight of stairs leads to the concourse level	18 January 2003; 23 years ago	Named after Bakau wood, used for building foundations.	1°23′16.27″N 103°54′18.96″E
SE4	Kangkar	View of Kangkar station exterior	18 January 2003; 23 years ago	Named after a former fishery in the area.	1°23′1.46″N 103°54′7.90″E
SE5	Ranggung	View of Ranggung station exterior	18 January 2003; 23 years ago	Named after a species of stork residing on the shore of Punggol.	1°23′1.03″N 103°53′51.85″E
West loop
SW1	Cheng Lim	View of Cheng Lim LRT exterior	1 January 2013; 13 years ago	Named after the former Cheng Lim Farmway and Lorong Cheng Lim, where farms formerly existed. The roads in turn are named after Goh Cheng Lim, who was the director of ship-based corporation Kim Hock Hoe Ltd.	1°23′47″N 103°53′37″E
SW2	Farmway	View of Farmway LRT platforms	15 November 2007; 19 years ago	Named after the former Cheng Lim Farmway and Lorong Cheng Lim, where farms formerly existed. The roads in turn are named after Goh Cheng Lim, who was the director of ship-based corporation Kim Hock Hoe Ltd.	1°23′56.32″N 103°53′20.08″E
SW3	Kupang	View of Kupang LRT platforms	27 June 2015; 11 years ago	"Mussel" in Malay. Named after the practice of mussel fishing.	1°23′57.22″N 103°52′52.75″E
SW4	Thanggam	View of Thanggam LRT exterior	29 January 2005; 21 years ago	"Gold" in Tamil. A pedestrian bridge connects the station to Jalan Kayu.	1°23′57.68″N 103°52′29.26″E
SW5	Fernvale	Exterior view of Fernvale station next to Seletar Mall	29 January 2005; 21 years ago	The station was originally intended to be integrated with a commercial building. It is close to the Selatar Mall, which opened on 28 November 2014.	1°23′35.55″N 103°52′34.69″E
SW6	Layar	The island platform of Layar station with ventaliation fans. Platform barriers minimise commuters' access to the tracks.	29 January 2005; 21 years ago	"To sail" in Malay.	1°23′38.49″N 103°52′47.11″E
SW7	Tongkang	View of Tongkang LRT platforms	29 January 2005; 21 years ago	Named after the tongkang, a small boat used to transport goods along rivers.	1°23′27.88″N 103°53′08.78″E
SW8	Renjong	via=Exterior of Renjong LRT station	29 January 2005; 21 years ago	"Tall" and "to raise" in Malay.	1°23′11.81″N 103°53′25.53″E

== Infrastructure ==
=== Rolling stock ===
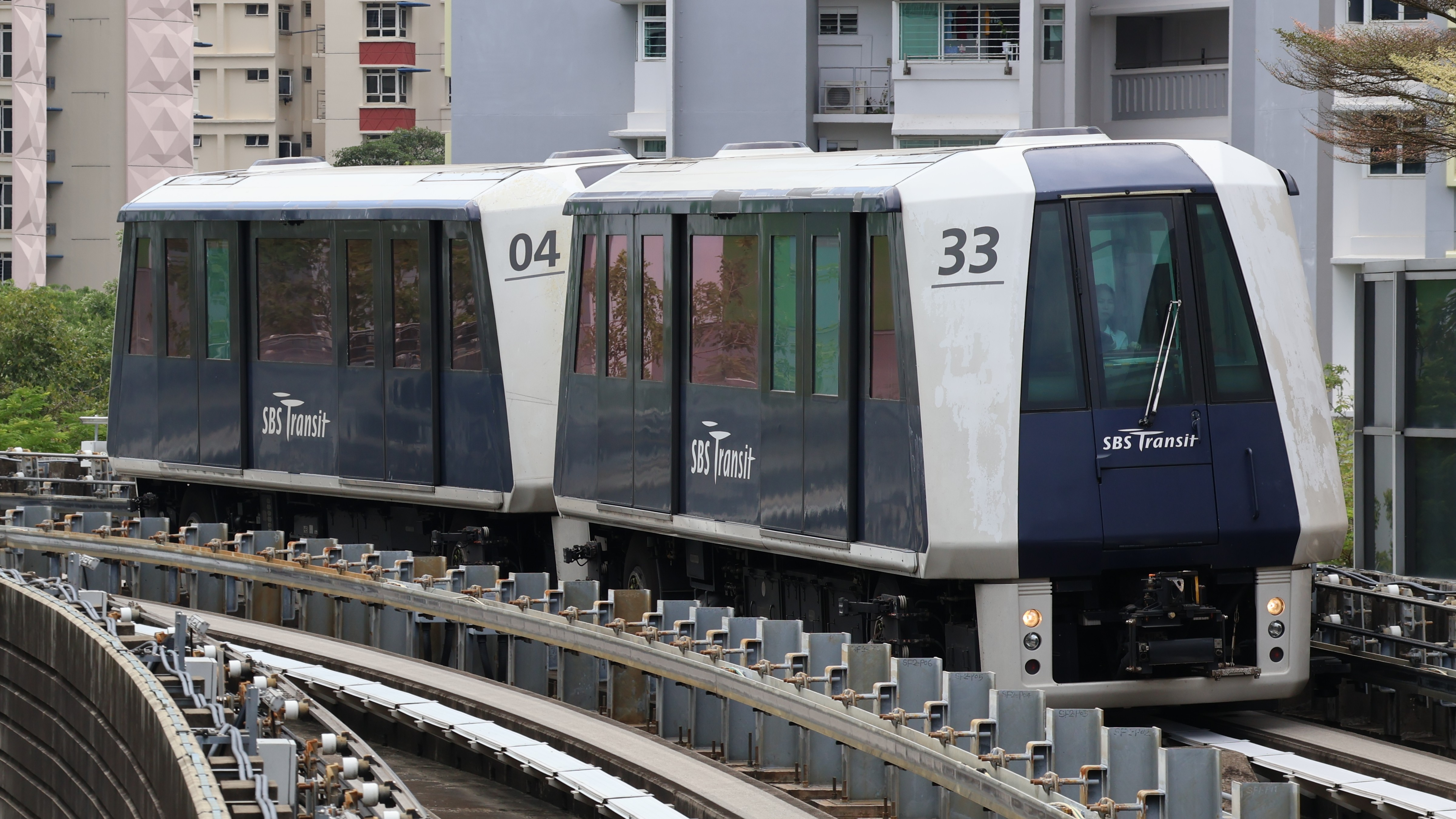
A two-car Mitsubishi Crystal Mover approaching Fernvale station

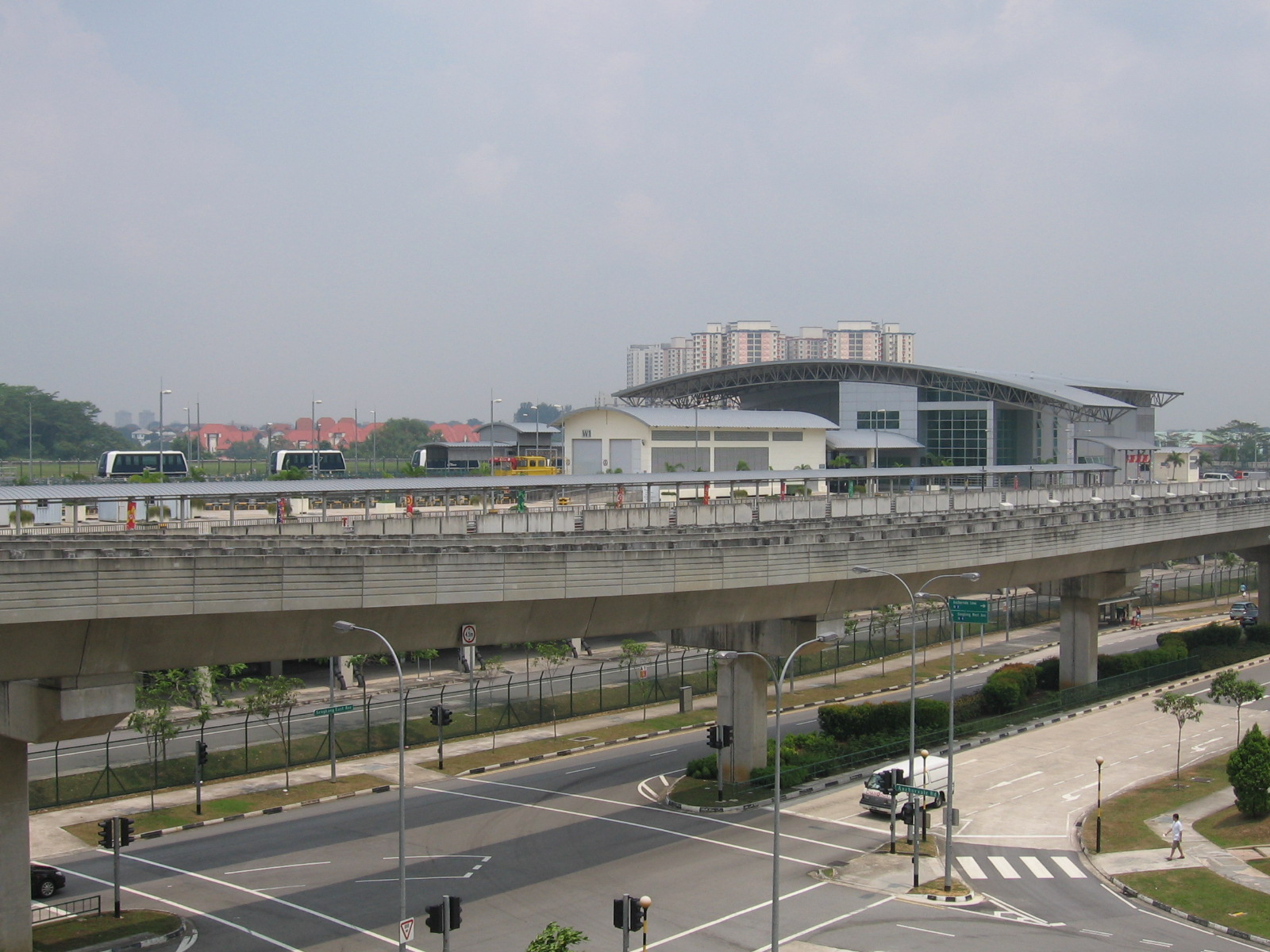
The LRT trains on the Sengkang–Punggol LRT lines are parked at the top level of Sengkang Depot.

The Sengkang and Punggol LRT lines (SPLRT) utilise the Crystal Mover Automated People Mover (APM) rolling stock manufactured by Mitsubishi Heavy Industries. The rubber-tyred trains are fully automatic and can accommodate up to 105 passengers per vehicle. The SPLRT has an initial fleet of 41 APMs, with 16 more APMs delivered under contract C810A. The APMs are configured for single car or two-car operations, with a maximum capacity of 36 trainsets on the network. In February 2022, the LTA ordered another fleet of 17 two-car APMs (Note: Under contract 810D) from Mitsubishi for S$439 million (US$322 million) . This was followed by another order for eight more two-car trains in May 2023, costing S$87 million (US$64 million). The new trains are set to replace the 25 one-car trains and half of the 16 two-car trains, bringing the overall SPLRT fleet to 33 two-car APMs. The first two trainsets were delivered to Singapore on 23 November 2024, and entered passenger service on 15 July 2025. Initially serving the Punggol LRT, the APMs began service on the Sengkang LRT in January 2026. Eight additional LRT trains would be procured, bringing the SPLRT fleet to 41 two-car APMs by 2030.

The Crystal Mover APMs have a top speed of 80 km/h (50 mph), with a maximum operational speed of 70 km/h (43 mph). They are powered by 750V DC third rail located on one side of the guideway. Each vehicle is 11.84 m (38.8 ft) long and 2.69 m (8.8 ft) wide. The exterior has a crystal-like design with a polyhedral nose reflective of its namesake. Mitsubishi describes the curved sides of the Crystal Mover APM as a design choice to "soften" the sharpness of its polyhedral shape. The exterior is painted pearl white and indigo blue.

As driverless cars, the APMs do not include a driver cabin. Instead, detrainment doors at both ends of the cabin allow emergency evacuation of passengers onto the track. The emergency stop button and emergency notice system are located at the right-side corner of the vehicle's front, while line maps and service information are displayed on the left. The interior features white side panels and ceiling, a grey floor, greyish-blue seats, and handrails and grip bars accented in a wine colour. The cabins are air-conditioned.

The SPLRT trains are maintained and stabled on the second floor of Sengkang Depot. Located between the Layar and Tongkang LRT stations, the depot also houses the trains of the North East Line. Its facilitates include a two-story main building with an operation control centre room, automatic vehicle washing facility, maintenance garage, departure inspection track, stabling yard, power receiving and transforming facilities, and a test track. The 3.5-hectare (8.6-acre) site is being expanded to 11.1 hectares (27 acres), which will include two more reception tracks and three new traction power substations to expand the depot's stabling and maintenance capacity.

=== Train control and power system ===
The Sengkang LRT line is fully automatic and is equipped with a Kyosan Electric APM fixed block signalling system. The line's automatic train control (ATC) is composed of automatic train protection (ATP) which ensures safe operations, automatic train operation (ATO) which controls the automatic operations, and automatic train supervision (ATS) for overall command, monitoring and recording of the system. To reduce equipment mass on the train, the onboard ATP and ATO systems are integrated into one unit, although for safety reasons, the function and control logic of the ATP and ATO systems remain independent. These subsystems are connected via LAN and managed by a computer-based interlocking (CBI) system that oversees traffic safety of the APM. In July 2024, the LTA reported that the SPLRT has a "mean kilometres between failures" (MKBF) of 814,000 train-km (506,000 train-miles), which was a decrease from 1.22 million train-km (760,000 train-miles) in 2023.

The power system of the SKLRT includes a 22 kV AC power intake and distribution network, a 750V DC traction power system, and a 400V AC system for station services. Power is supplied via two 22kV AC feeders from the North East Line to improve reliability and take advantage of the 66kV tariff. The AC supply is distributed through a closed ring network to prevent power disruptions during single outages. At each station, the AC supply is stepped down to 400V AC using service transformers for mechanical and electrical needs. Traction power substations (TPSS) further step down the 22kV AC to power rectifiers that convert it to 750V DC for train operations. Each TPSS is equipped with an inverter system to return excess energy from regenerative braking back to the 22kV distribution network. In 2004, the SKLRT had three TPSS, with one on standby to maintain operations during outages; it presently has five operational substations, which will increase to eight with the planned expansion of Sengkang Depot.

=== Station facilities ===
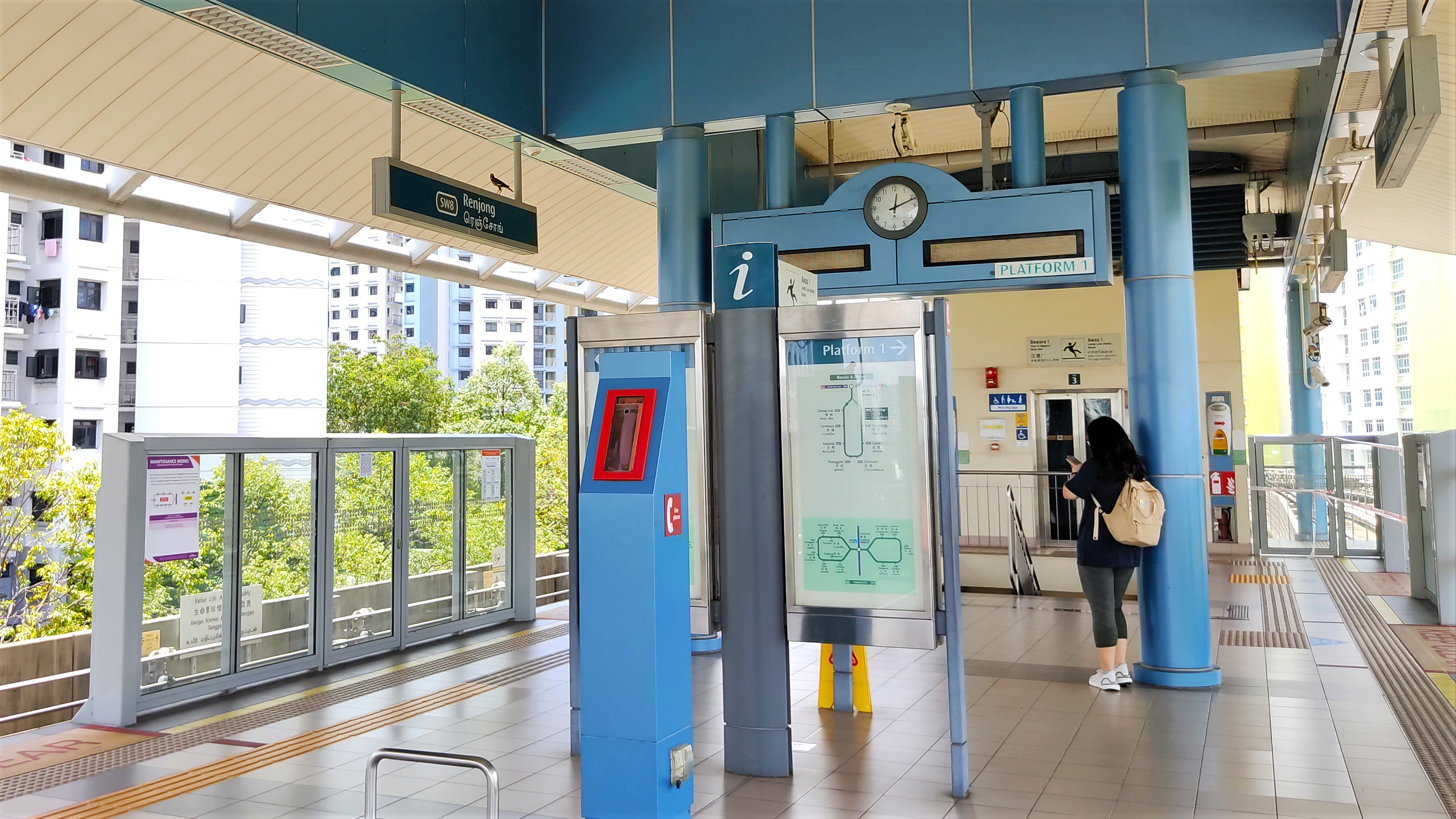
Platform barriers and a fire phone on Renjong LRT platforms

All Sengkang LRT stations are equipped with lifts connecting passengers from the ground level to the station concourse, and from the concourse to the platform level. Each station also has at least one wider faregate for wheelchair users and tactile flooring to guide the visually-impaired from the ground floor to the platforms. The stations are also equipped with fire extinguishers and fire phones. Emergency stop buttons on both sides of the station platform, when activated, cut off traction power supply and halt incoming trains.

Fixed platform barriers are intended to prevent commuters falling to the tracks. However, these barriers lack doors and instead have fixed openings for boarding, as the limited space on LRT platforms cannot accommodate the power, communications, and signal control systems required for platform screen doors. To enhance safety, SBS Transit has implemented the VAnGuard track intrusion detection system on the SPLRT. Using video analytics and artificial intelligence, the system monitors footage of tracks and platforms to identify individuals or objects on the tracks. When an intrusion is detected, operations control centre staff can press the emergency stop button to halt services on a specific loop. The system also triggers an alarm when intruders or foreign objects are detected. In addition to track intrusions, the system can spot unattended items on station platforms, allowing staff to provide assistance or undertake security precautions.

== Notes and references ==
=== Sources ===
- APM Signaling System (PDF) (Report). Japan: Kyosan Electric. n.d.
- Chow, Clarice; Chia, Jean; Zhan, Mina (2018). Integrating Land Use & Mobility: Supporting Sustainable Growth (PDF). Singapore: Centre for Liveable Cities. ISBN 978-981-11-7091-1. Archived (PDF) from the original on 2 February 2025.
- Mochidome, Hiroyuki; Masukawa, Masahisa (June 2003). Automated People Mover System "Crystal Mover" for Singapore's LTA (PDF) (Report). Japan: Mitsubishi Heavy Industries.
