= Singapore Combat Engineers =

- Logo of the Singapore Combat Engineers
- Active: April 1967 – present
- Country: Singapore
- Branch: Singapore Army
- Type: Combat engineering
- Role: Combat engineering EOD; CBRN
- Size: 5 battalions
- Part of: Singapore Armed Forces
- Garrison/HQ: Jurong Camp I Nee Soon Camp; Seletar Camp; Sungei Gedong Camp
- Mottos: Advance and Overcome
- Colors: Dark Blue
- Website: official website

Commanders
- Chief Engineer Officer: COL Ong Cher Howe

The Singapore Combat Engineers (SCE) is a formation of the Singapore Army. Combat Engineers provide mobility by bridging gaps and clearing minefields to facilitate speedy advance of troops into enemy territory, and counter-mobility by constructing obstacles such as anti-tank ditches to impede the enemy's movement. The Combat Engineers also construct trenches, drainage systems and other related infrastructure to enhance the survivability of troops during operations.

== History ==
When the Singapore Armed Forces Training Institute (SAFTI) was set up in 1967 as the first military training institute to train officers and non-commissioned officers (NCOs, now known as Specialists), an Engineer Training Wing was incorporated into the plan. Two young officers, 2LT Gurcharan Singh and 2LT Chng Teow Hua, were selected to attend a basic engineer officer's course in Fort Belvoir, Virginia, United States. Upon completion of their course, these two officers, with the Commanding Officer, MAJ George Mitchell, conducted the first Engineer Commanders' Course from April to August 1968. The graduate officers and NCOs from the course formed the nucleus of the SCE.

As its role became more defined and her responsibilities expanded, the Engineer Wing was renamed to School of Field Engineers and moved from SAFTI (now Pasir Laba Camp) to new premises on Pulau Blakang Mati (now Sentosa) in the same year and subsequently branched out to other camps such as Gillman Camp and Loyang Camp (both now defunct). In April 1970, the Engineer Headquarters (EHQ) was established with MAJ Mitchell as the Senior Engineer Officer. The EHQ was renamed HQ Singapore Combat Engineer in 1974 and the commander's designation was changed to Chief Engineer Officer.

== Motto ==
The Formation's motto, "Advance and Overcome" is derived from the Combat Engineers' fundamental role in providing mobility for advancing troops by overcoming all obstacles. The Combat Engineers believe they are advancing in terms of technology and techniques, overcoming adversities along the way – all part of their efforts to better fulfill missions of providing mobility, counter-mobility and ensuring survivability for the Army.

== Insignia ==
The gold colour stands for the sterling qualities of the Combat Engineers – their steadfast spirit and durable nature. The black is for their ability to provide continuous support throughout hours of darkness.

The castle is a symbol of the construction power of the Combat Engineers as seen in the bridges, fortifications, roads and obstacles often built by them. The interlocking bricks show the strength, endurance and high degree of teamwork required to accomplish engineer tasks. The bayonet represents the offensive spirit of the Engineers in piercing the enemy defences, while the twin bolts of lightning stand for the destructive demolition power of the Combat Engineers.

== Headquarters ==
- Jurong Camp I - 30SCE
- Nee Soon Camp - HQ SCE, ETI, 36SCE, 39SCE & HQ CBRE DG
- Seletar Camp - HQ ARMCEG, 35SCE
- Sungei Gedong Camp - 38SCE

== Combat Engineers Colours ==
On 22 January 1977, the first Combat Engineers Colours were presented to the Combat Engineers formation by the former President Benjamin Henry Sheares at Jurong Town Stadium. The presentation of Colours signifies esprit de corps, pride and identity. "The brown base colour represented the harsh terrain that Engineers must always advance through and overcome. The sword, wings and anchor depicted the support given to the land, airborne and amphibious forces while the laurel and words formed a golden circle representing unity."

It was replaced with a different design in October 1991.

== Structure ==
The Combat Engineers formation consists of two headquarters, a training institute, five active battalions, and ten reservist battalions. Each brigade of the army has an organic company of field engineers, deployed at the discretion of the brigade commander, while each infantry battalion has an organic platoon of pioneers to support battalion movement.

Unlike the usual infantry sections of seven men, a field engineer section consists of six men. There are two specialists in a section, the section commander and the section 2IC.

=== Headquarters Singapore Combat Engineers (HQ SCE) ===
Specialist HQ to the SAF on all matters pertaining to Combat Engineer Operations. Responsible for developing core engineer capabilities in terms of Mobility, Countermobility & Survivability.

=== Engineer Training Institute (ETI) ===
The Engineer Training Institute is the combination of three former Combat Engineer training schools, namely School of Combat Engineers (SOCE), Division Engineer Training Centre (DETC) and Armoured Engineer Training Centre (AETC). AETC was removed from ETI as of 1997 and re-established as an active unit, now officially known as the 38th Battalion, Singapore Combat Engineers (38SCE).

ETI currently comprises Engineer Commander Training School (ECTS), Engineer Vocational Training School (EVTS), Division Engineer Training Centre (DETC) and Engineer Staff Training Centre (ESTC). The motto for ETI is Seek. Strive. Excel..

=== 30th Battalion, Singapore Combat Engineers (30SCE) ===
Originally formed as the 30th Combat Engineer Battalion (30 CEB) on 1 November 1968, the 30th Battalion, Singapore Combat Engineers (30SCE) provides the combat engineering capability of the 3rd Singapore Division, as well as Field and Plant Engineer support to the divisions and brigades of the Singapore Army. Typical Field Engineer tasks include demolition, fortification and the building of wire obstacles and minefields, while Plant Engineers operate heavy construction machinery. The battalion consists of three field companies and a Mechanized Equipment Company, and is responsible for the clearing of obstacles in the paths of advancing forces, the opening of main and alternate supply routes, and ensuring the mobility of the army's manoeuvre elements (i.e. armour and infantry forces). They also construct obstacles to deny movement to the enemy during retrograde operations and field fortifications for the protection of friendly forces.

Field Engineers employ the Medium Girder Bridge, introduced to the Singapore Combat Engineers in 1975. A field engineer company of around 100 men would take seven hours to construct a bridge spanning more than 50 metres. It was eventually replaced by the Foldable Longspan Bridge (FLB) in 2001, where 12 men require three hours to construct a 46-metre span of bridge. Also used is the Cobra Projection Line Charge (PLC), a man-packed portable, rocket propelled minefield lane clearing charge used to clear infantry lanes through minefields. Plant Engineers are known to operate commercial construction equipment such as excavators, shovels, bulldozers and cranes.

The battalion's motto is Overcome With Speed, Fortify With Strength, and its mascot is the polar bear.

=== Army Combat Engineer Group (ARMCEG) ===
The Army Combat Engineer Group (ARMCEG) was formed on 31 March 1993, as an operational command for bridging engineers in the SAF. It ensures that the SAF is equipped with the necessary mobility and counter-mobility capabilities so that troops are able to remain mobile and overcome obstacles in their missions.

=== 35th Battalion, Singapore Combat Engineers (35SCE) ===
35SCE is the battalion specialised in military bridging. Consisting of a number of companies, the battalion provides the transportation means in the form of float bridges, rafts and assault boats for the projection of combat troops and vehicles across rivers and water obstacles to facilitate troop movements.

Established in 1969, the 35th Battalion Singapore Combat Engineers was first called 35 CEB, based at Loyang Camp with ten officers and 30 NCOs. In 1971, the battalion relocated to its current base at Seletar Camp.

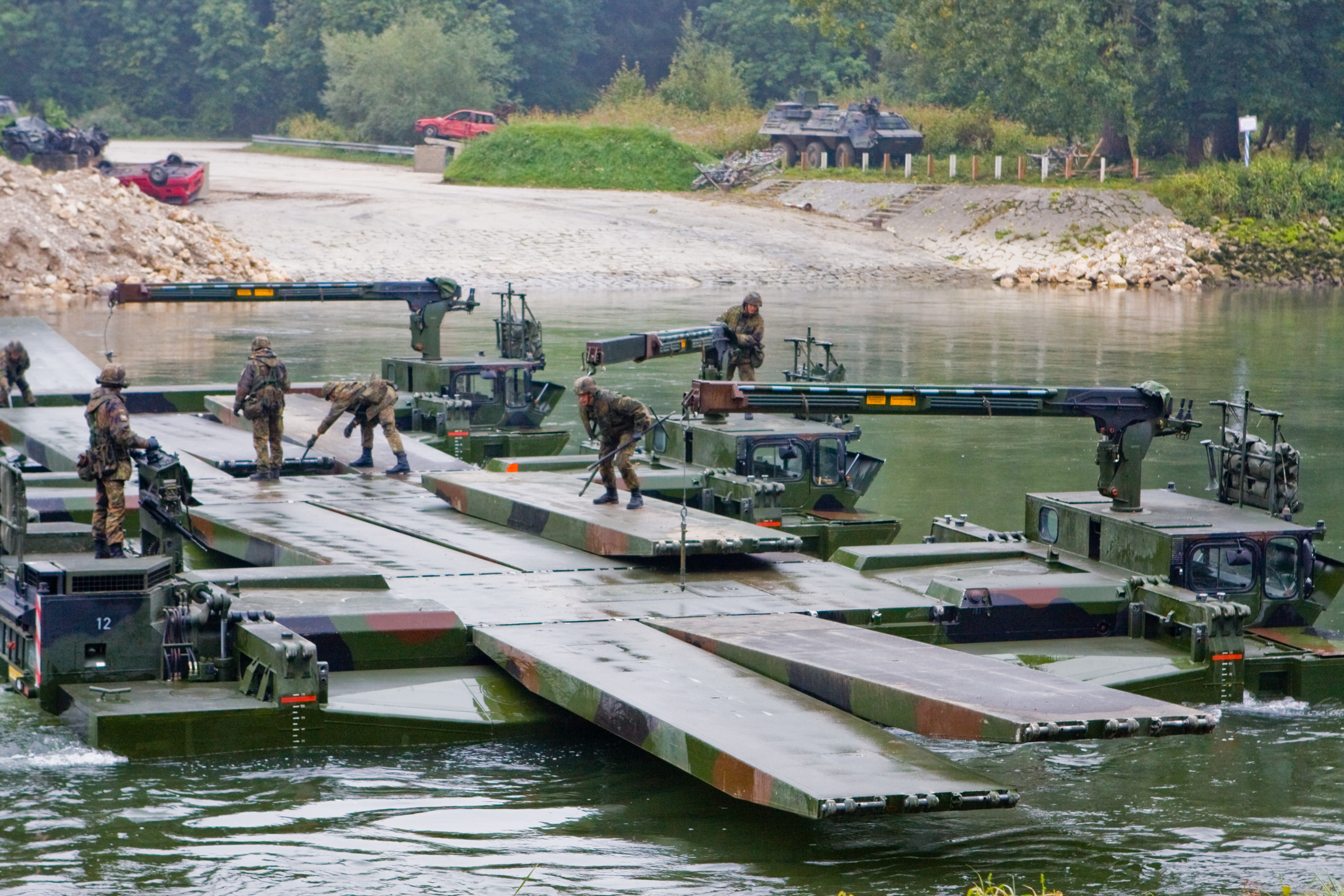
M3G in German military service

The 35th battalion is known to use a variety of bridging equipment. Each company is split into three platoons and each bridging platoon operates four M3G Float Bridges which each require an operating crew of four men. Each raft consists of two rigs, which form a Class 60 raft or a float bridge when coupled together further.

Separately, the battalion houses a specialised Boat unit that comprises an undisclosed number of platoons. This unit operates in key areas such as the rapid deployment alongside an elite fighting force for projection across water bodies and the execution of tactical coastal hook operations (an offensive flanking manoeuvre). It operates with 2 different open-top launch boats namely, the Assault Boat ("AB") and General Support Boat ("GSB"). The company's motto is "Forged in Toughness", achieving mission critical success regardless of time, terrain, tide or weather.

Accompanying the battalion is a Combat Support company with a Singapore Signals platoon, a Surveillance platoon and a Plant (Heavy equipment) platoon. It is tasked with supporting the overall operations of the bridging battalion.

In January 2005, 35SCE was deployed to Meulaboh as part of Operation Flying Eagle, Singapore's response to the 2004 Indian Ocean earthquake and tsunami. A 45-man combat engineering team was sent ashore to prepare landing points for supplies and equipment to be offloaded from the three Endurance class landing platform dock ships of the Republic of Singapore Navy anchored off Meulaboh. The engineers also assisted in the clearing of debris and roads and the creation of the helicopter landing points.

The mascot of 35SCE is the crocodile, and its motto is Power Projection.

=== 38th Battalion, Singapore Combat Engineers (38SCE) ===
Formerly named the Armoured Engineer Training Centre, the unit was renamed to 38SCE on 29 April 2009 following its reprofiling as an active Armoured Engineer unit. The battalion's motto is Steadfast and Gallant, with the African Elephant as its mascot.

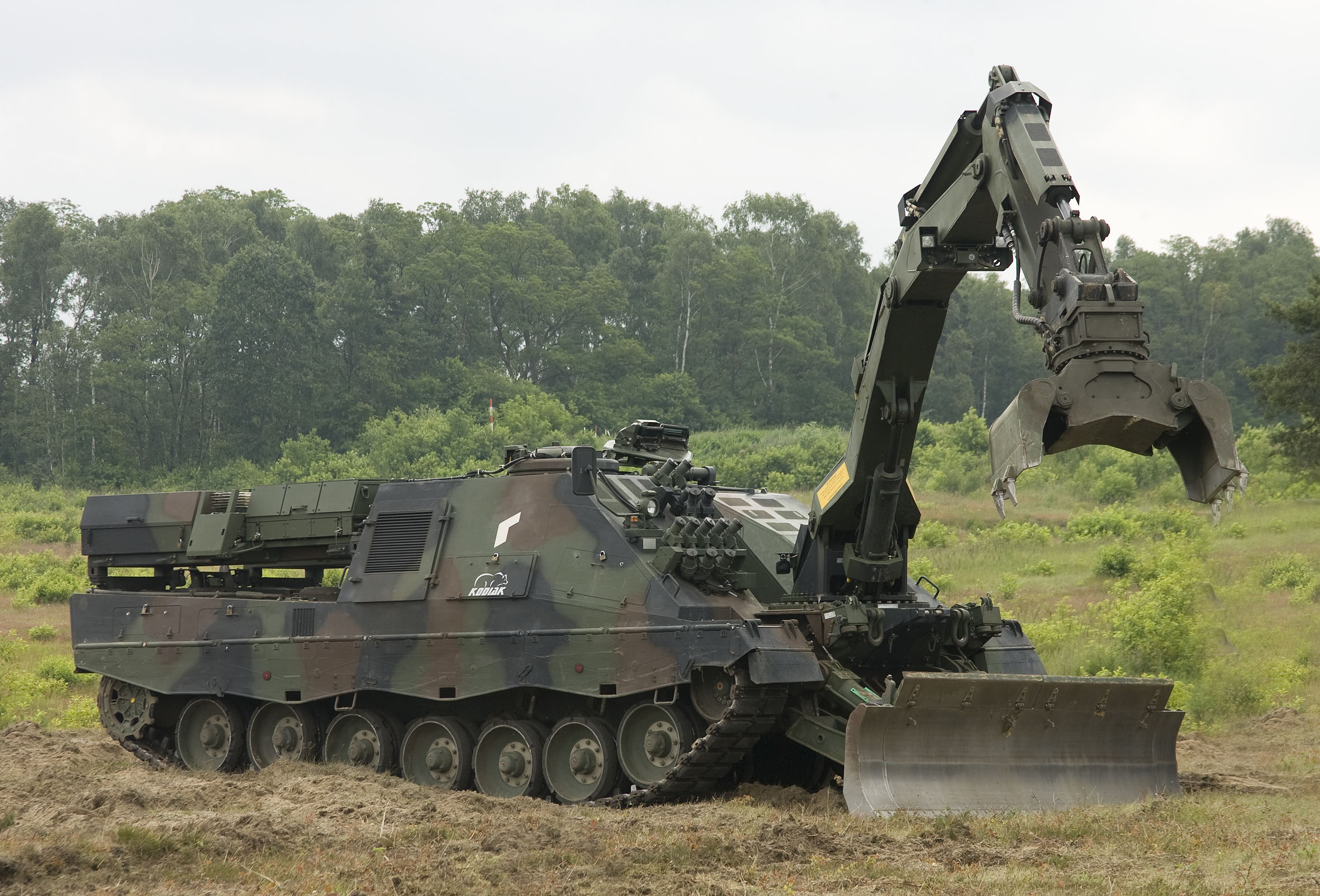
AEV3 Kodiak combat engineer vehicle in Rheinmetall colours

The Battalion employs Leopard 2-based engineering vehicles such as the AEV 3 Kodiak and the Leopard 2 Vehicle Launched Bridge, as well as the Bionix Vehicle Launched Bridge, Trailblazer counter-mine vehicle and Bronco all-terrain tracked carrier. The unit was formerly equipped with the M728 Combat Engineer Vehicle, M60 armoured vehicle launched bridge, FV180 Combat Engineer Tractor, AMX-13 based bridges and various M113-based equipment.

=== Chemical, Biological, Radiological and Explosives Defence Group (CBRE DG) ===
The Chemical, Biological, Radiological and Explosives Defence Group (CBRE DG) was established in October 2002 with the integration of the operations and training of CBRD and EOD under a unified command. The CBRE DG manages all issues concerning counter-terrorist CBRE development. Since its inception, CBRE DG has been an integral part of the SAF's ongoing effort in the build-up of a comprehensive counter-terrorism capability against conventional and non-conventional threats, and conducts Preventive and Response CBRE operations in conjunction with the Home Team agencies on both the home and international fronts.

On 4 April 2019, CBRE DG bid farewell to Seletar Camp and moved to its new home with 36 SCE and 39 SCE within the CBRE Cluster in Nee Soon Camp.

The CBRE DG comprises the 36th and 39th Battalions, Singapore Combat Engineers, and the Medical Response Force (MRF) from the SAF Medical Corps, which provides on-scene medical treatment for casualties of chemical and biological agents. Its motto is Prepared and Vigilant.

=== 36th Battalion, Singapore Combat Engineers (36SCE) ===
Formed in 1969 as the Bomb Disposal Unit (BDU), the 36th Battalion, Singapore Combat Engineers is the Explosive Ordnance Disposal (EOD) Unit of the Singapore Armed Forces, specialising in defusing explosive devices. In peacetime, 36SCE handles security sweeps, attends to discovered old war relics and Improvised explosive devices. In 1978, 36 SCE sent a team to Bangladesh to aid in the clearing of a 500 lb aerial bomb.

On 4 April 2019, 36 SCE bid farewell to Selarang Camp and moved to its new home with 39 SCE and CBRE DG within the CBRE Cluster in Nee Soon Camp.

Its motto is Towards Perfection. Its mascot is the German Shepherd Dog.

=== 39th Battalion, Singapore Combat Engineers (39SCE) ===
The 39th Battalion, Singapore Combat Engineers, is the chemical, biological and radiological defence (CBRD) unit of the Singapore Armed Forces, formed to improve the survivability of troops in a chemical warfare environments. It decontaminates incident sites that contain chemical or biological hazards and provides a sustained, multi-incident response capability. 39SCE also works closely with the Singapore Civil Defence Force (SCDF) in the event of a chemical attack.

The Gulf War highlighted the increased threat of chemical weapons, prompting the SAF to begin Individual Chemical Defence familiarisation training for its servicemen in 1991. In response, 39SCE was raised on 1 December 1993 as a company strength unit at Seletar East Camp to develop a chemical defence capability, and to conduct training and experimentation in the areas of chemical protection, detection and decontamination. By 1996, the SAF had developed a limited chemical response capability, which it fielded for the first time during the World Trade Organization Conference held in Singapore. Following the September 11 attacks, the Singapore Combat Engineer's EOD and CBRD battalions have worked with Home Affairs agencies to provide security coverage for significant international events.

On 4 April 2019, 39 SCE bid farewell to Seletar Camp and moved to its new home with 36 SCE and CBRE DG within the CBRE Cluster in Nee Soon Camp.

Its motto is Protect & Preserve. Its mascot is the mongoose.

== See also ==
- Sapper
