= Seletar Airport =

Minor commercial and general aviation airport in Singapore

Seletar Airport Lapangan Terbang Seletar

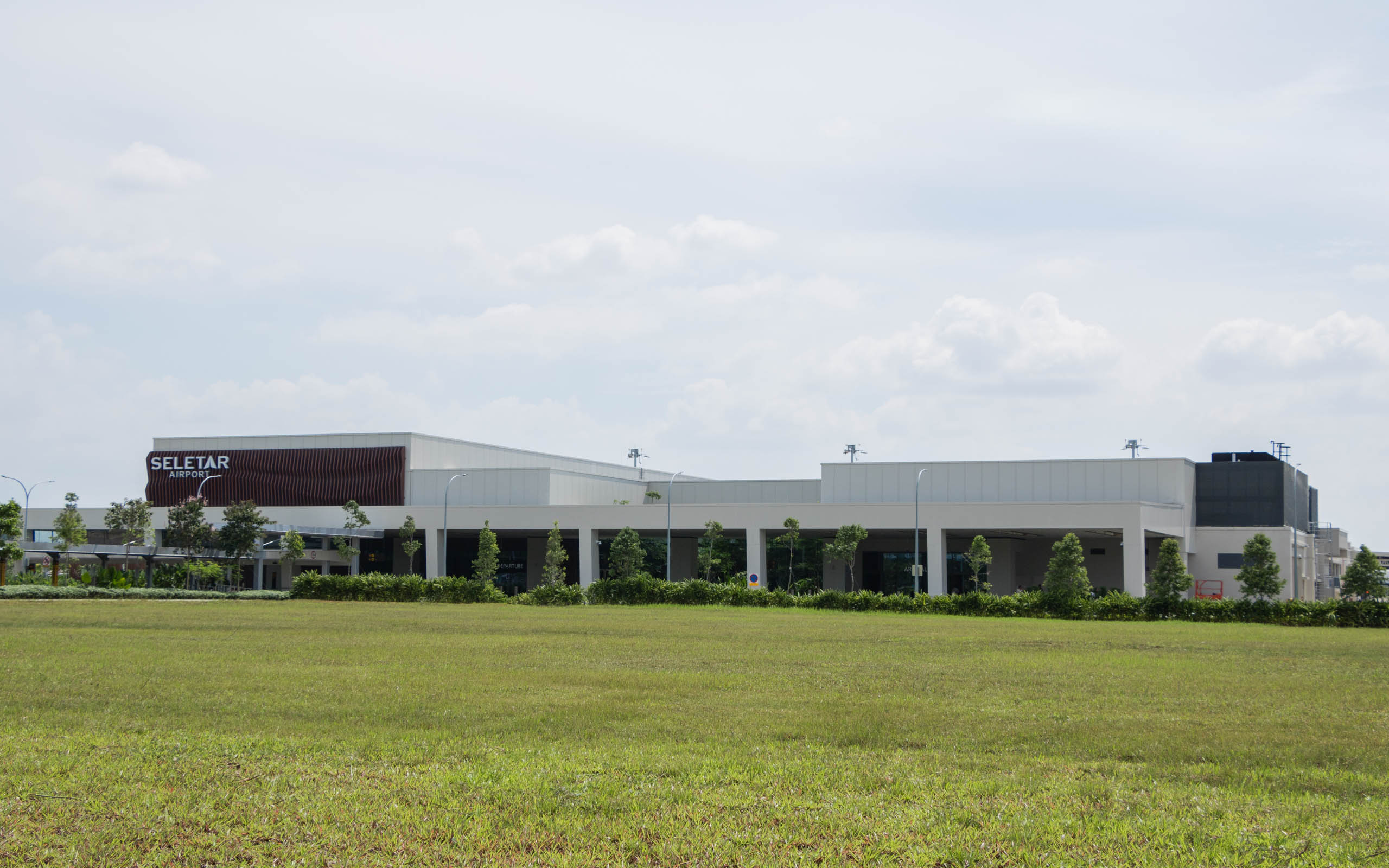
- IATA: XSP; ICAO: WSSL

Summary
- Airport type: Public
- Owner/Operator: Changi Airport Group
- Serves: Singapore
- Location: 21 Seletar Aerospace Road 1, North-East Region, Singapore 797405
- Opened: 28 February 1928; 98 years ago
- Elevation AMSL: 14 m (46 ft)
- Coordinates: 01°25′01″N 103°52′04″E
- Website: www.seletarairport.com

Map
- Location in Singapore XSP/WSSL (Southeast Asia) XSP/WSSL (Asia)

Runways
Direction	Length		Surface
Direction	m	ft	Surface
03/21	1,836	6,024	Asphalt
- Sources: CAAS - Civil Aviation Authority of Singapore

Seletar Airport (Note: Pronounced /səˈliːtɑːr/ sə-LEE-tar; Chinese: 实里达机场; Malay: Lapangan Terbang Seletar; Tamil: செலட்டர் விமான நிலையம்.) (IATA: XSP, ICAO: WSSL) is a civilian international airport serving the north-east region of Singapore. It is located approximately 16 km (10 miles) northwest from Changi Airport, the country's main airport, and 14.6 km (9.1 miles) north from the main commercial city-centre.

The airfield was originally opened in 1928 as RAF Seletar, a military airbase of the British Royal Air Force (RAF). The base was transferred to Singapore in 1971. The Government of Singapore intended for Seletar Airport and the surrounding areas to function as the operating aerodrome for their plan to expand Singapore's status as an industrial aviation hub, today known as the Seletar Aerospace Park.

Today, Seletar Airport mostly serves turbo-prop and smaller private and business jet airlines and aircraft. It helps to serve as a secondary destination to Singapore for turbo-prop aircraft to decrease the load on Changi Airport, which has heavy air traffic (primarily passenger airlines). The airport is able to serve aircraft with sizes up to Boeing 757. The runway designation is 03/21, where the precise headings on ground of the actual runway are 033° / 213°.

== History ==
=== RAF Seletar ===
RAF Seletar badge

RAF Seletar was a Royal Air Force station in Singapore between 1928 and 1971. Plans for establishing an airfield, flying boat and naval base in Singapore were first agreed by the RAF in 1921. In 1923, two sites in the northern region of the island were approved. The first planes to arrive at the base were four Supermarine Southampton seaplanes on 28 February 1928.

RAF Seletar was also used for civilian flights from 1930 to 1937, from which operations were succeeded by Kallang Airport.

Amy Johnson landed at Seletar in May 1930 on her UK – Australia flight in her Gipsy Moth named 'Jason'. Amelia Earhart also landed there in June 1937 on her world flight attempt in an Lockheed 10 Electra.

==== World War II ====
With the threat of war in the area, the RAF started building up their forces in the Far East in the late 1930s and early 1940s. Seletar airfield was the target of carpet bombing when Japanese navy bombers conducted the first air raid on Singapore, sometime after their ground forces invaded Kota Bahru. It was abandoned when the Japanese took Johor Bahru, which brought their artillery in range of the airfield.

When the Japanese launched their invasion of Malaya and Singapore, Seletar housed four RAF units. 205 Sqn operated Consolidated Catalina flying boats, and No. 36 and No. 100 Squadron RAF operated obsolete Vickers Vildebeest torpedo bombers (as well as five Fairey Albacores acquired by 36 Sqn to supplement its Vildebeests). These flying squadrons were serviced by 151 Maintenance Unit RAF.

21 Squadron, Royal Australian Air Force was also based at Seletar in 1941–42, and was in the process of converting from lightly armed CAC Wirraway trainers to Brewster F2A Buffalo fighters, when hostilities began.

These units stayed until January–February 1942, soon before the surrender to the invading Japanese.

During the Japanese occupation, Seletar as was in the case of Sembawang came under the Imperial Japanese Navy Air Service while Tengah fell under the jurisdiction of the Imperial Japanese Army Air Force. From 1942 through 1945, a number of IJN squadrons were based or transited through Seletar mainly, for training. Among the units known to be based at Seletar during this time were 936th Kōkūtai (B5N Kate, D3A Val and E13A1 Jake), 381st Kōkūtai (A6M Zero and J2M Raiden). The 601st Kōkūtai was also stationed there for training early before its destruction on board Japanese aircraft carriers during the Battle of the Philippine Sea (Marianas Turkey Shoot) in June. Seletar's present runway was built during the Japanese Occupation.

==== Post-World War II ====
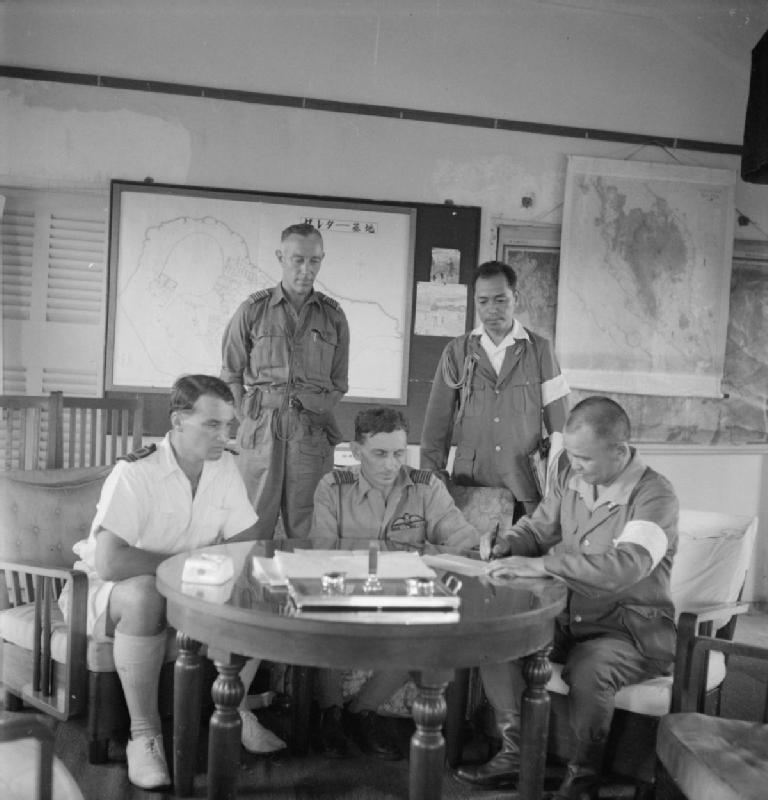
Royal Navy and RAF officers watch as Vice Admiral Kogure appends his signature to the document marking the formal takeover of Seletar airfield from the Japanese, 8 September 1945.

After World War II, the base went back to the RAF and, in the late 1940s and 1950s, the base was heavily involved in the Malayan Emergency, with Beaufighters, Spitfires and Mosquitos based there while operating against Malayan Communist insurgents. Among the many squadrons based there during this time were Nos 60, 81 and 205 Sqns of the RAF. The base was also the home of 390 MU – the Maintenance Base for the whole of the RAF Far East Air Force - FEAF.

During the 1960s, RAF Seletar was home base to No's 103 and 110 Squadrons, both of which were equipped with Westland Whirlwind Mk 10 helicopters and to 34 Squadron, which was equipped with Blackburn Beverley transports. All three Squadrons (among several others) were involved with support of operations in North Borneo during the Indonesia-Malaysia confrontation. From June 1962, 66 Squadron (led by Sqn Leader Gray) with their Bristol 192 Belvedere helicopters were also based at Seletar, and were sent on frequent tours and detachments to Kuching, Brunei, Labuan and Butterworth as part of the Borneo hearts and minds campaign (the squadron was later disbanded in March 1969). The helicopter squadrons provided a search and rescue service for the Singapore area. The station was also, at that time, home to 209 Squadron, equipped with Single and Twin Pioneer aircraft. 65 Squadron based at Seletar operated Bloodhound Mk II surface-to-air missiles as anti-aircraft defence from 1 January 1964 until the squadron was disbanded on 30 March 1970 with the equipment and role handed over to 170 Squadron, Republic of Singapore Air Force. Auster aircraft were flown during the Emergency and Confrontation periods in troop/enemy spotting patrols.

In December 1966, three Andover CC Mk1 arrived to replace the ageing Vickers Valetta C1 aircraft of 52 Sqn. 52 Squadron was later reformed in March 1967 after the arrival of a further three aircraft. By now, Confrontation had finished and with no purpose the squadron moved to Changi in 1968 before being disbanded in January 1970.

The RAF station closed at the end of March 1971 (see East of Suez) and Seletar was handed over to Singapore's Department of Civil Aviation.

Several aircraft types flew their last RAF operational sorties from Seletar including the Short Singapore flying boat (Mk.III K6912 of No. 205 Squadron RAF 14 October 1941, aircraft transferred to No. 5 Squadron RNZAF), Supermarine Spitfire (PR.XIX PS888 of 81 Sqn 1954), De Havilland Mosquito (PR.34 RG314 of 81 Sqn 1955), Short Sunderland flying boat (GR.5 ML797 "P" of 205 Sqn, 15 May 1959) and Bristol Beaufighter (TT.X RD761 Station Flight 1960). The Short Sunderland flying boats started in RAF service from Seletar on 22 June 1938 with 230 Sqn, a sister squadron of 205 Sqn.

=== Seletar Airbase ===
The formative years of the SADC (later the RSAF) was established at Seletar Airbase in September 1968, with the setting up of the Flying Training School (FTS) utilising three Cessna 172G/H on loan from the Singapore Flying Club. The subsequent arrival of eight new Cessna 172Ks in May 1969, took over the duty from the former and contributed to the increase of training tempo for more selected trainees to participate in the basic flight-training course.

On 29 October 1977, four armed Vietnamese hijacked a domestic Air Vietnam flight from Saigon, Vietnam to Phu Quoc island west of Saigon, and forced the aircraft, a Douglas DC-3, to land at Seletar Airport. The hijackers killed two Vietnamese crew members and seriously wounded a third. The hijackers were seeking political asylum in Singapore and eventually surrendered themselves to Singapore authorities.

=== Changi Airport Group management ===
Changi Airport Group took over the management of the airport from the Civil Aviation Authority of Singapore on 1 July 2009.

As part of the Seletar Aerospace Park programme, the runway was extended to 1,840 metres in 2011 to enable larger and heavier aircraft to use the airport. The airport's avionics systems were also upgraded.

The airport underwent refurbishment in 2015 as part of plans to relieve pressure on Changi Airport by increasing Seletar Airport's capacity and move smaller and slower aircraft from Changi to Seletar airport.

A new passenger terminal building opened on 19 November 2018, replacing the previous passenger terminal. The terminal houses four check-in counters, six immigration lanes, two security screening stations and a gate holdroom that can accommodate 200 passengers.

==== Instrument Landing System (ILS) usage ====
In 2018, the use of the Instrument Landing System (ILS) at Seletar Airport by Singapore was disputed by Malaysia, saying that the flight path used by the system may encroach into its airspace. In 2019, an agreement was reached between the two countries whereby Malaysia will immediately suspend its permanent restricted area in the airspace over Pasir Gudang, while Singapore will similarly suspend its implementation of Instrument Landing System (ILS) procedures for Seletar Airport.

=== Current operations ===
Seletar Airport now operates as a general aviation airport, mainly for chartered flights, private aircraft operations and training purposes. The airport is currently open for arrivals and departures from 07:00 LCL until 22:00 LCL. It has a single runway with 27 aircraft stands, 100 square metres of warehouse space and can handle 840 tons of freight per day. In 1998, the airport recorded receiving a total of 7,945 scheduled flights, handled 23,919 passengers and 6,025 tons of cargo. The airport fire service, AES Seletar, is provided by Changi Airport Group. AES Seletar has 1 station housing 6 apparatus (water tender, foam tender and others) and provides Level 7 protection.

The Republic of Singapore Flying Club and Seletar Flying Club are situated at Seletar Airport. The renowned Singapore Youth Flying Club has its headquarters built on western side of the airport's runway. Completed in June 2003, the clubhouse also has its own parking bays for its fleet of Diamond DA40. In addition, the rotary training unit of Republic of Singapore Air Force – 124 Squadron, has a training detachment at the civilian airport although it is normally headquartered at Sembawang Air Base.

Previously, Berjaya Air operated scheduled flights to Tioman and Redang. The Berjaya Air service ended on 31 October 2010 and relocated to Changi Airport, though was discontinued after four years. Berjaya Air has since returned to Seletar from Redang on a charter basis.

Due to the COVID-19 pandemic, the number of daily commercial flight operations at the airport severely declined. Airport operations were also subjected to new processes and rules laid down by the Singapore government Ministry of Health and according to the Infectious Diseases Act. On 13 June 2022, Firefly marked the resumption of flights to the airport since the suspension of commercial flights due to the pandemic.

== Airlines and destinations ==
=== Passenger ===
Airlines	Destinations
Berjaya Air	Charter: Redang
Firefly	Kuala Lumpur–Subang

== Photo gallery ==
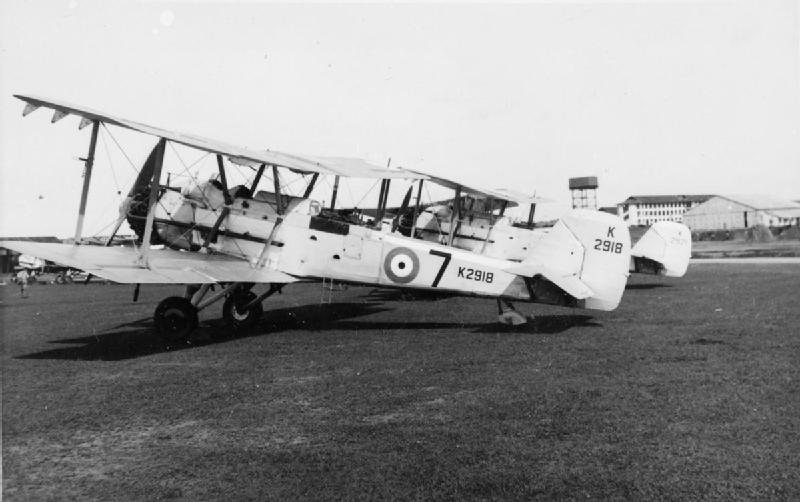
Vickers Vildebeest Mk IIs, K2918 and K2921, of 'A' Flight, No. 100 (TB) Squadron, at RAF Seletar

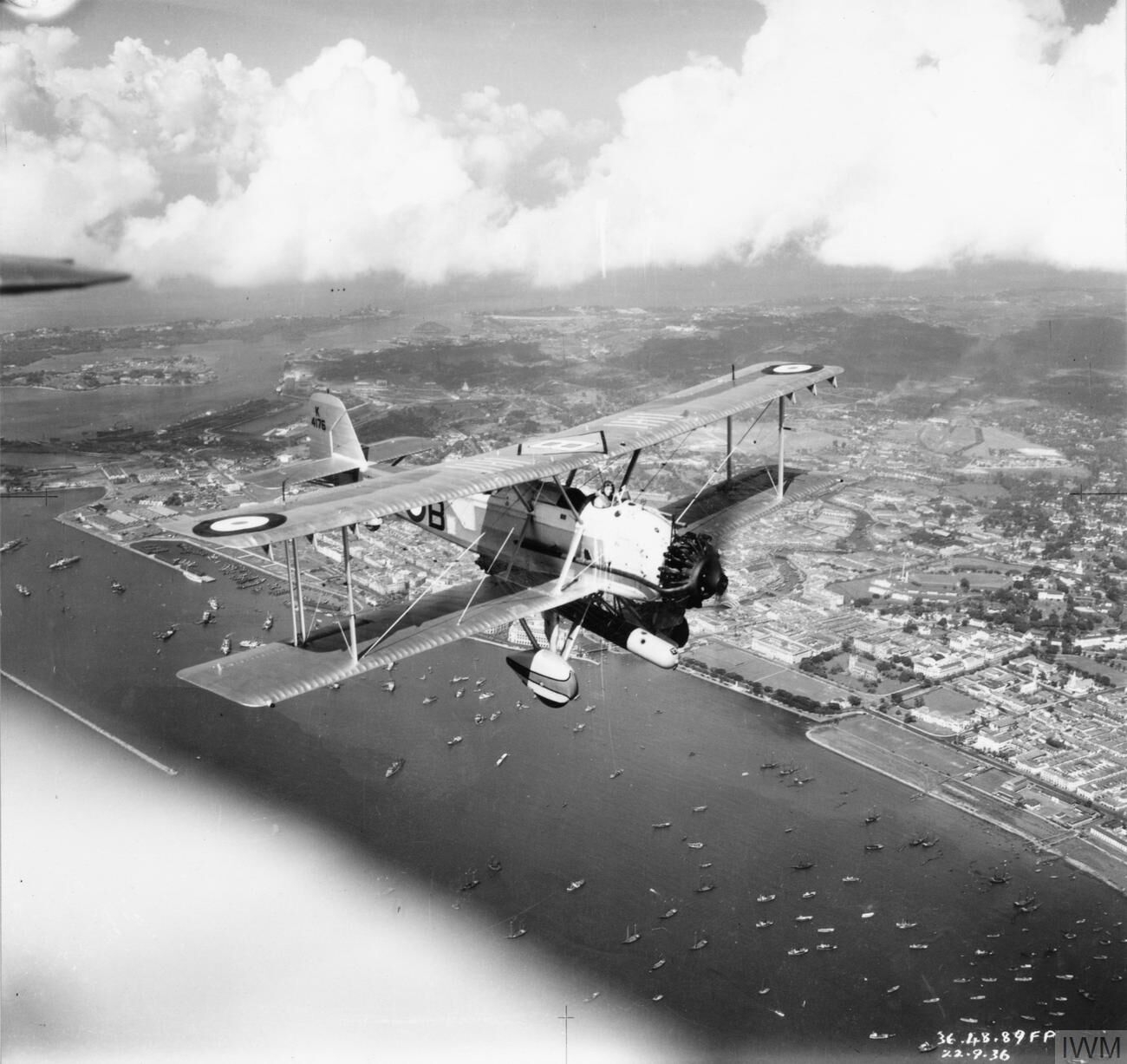
A Vickers Vildebeest Mk III of No. 36 Squadron RAF in flight over Singapore City

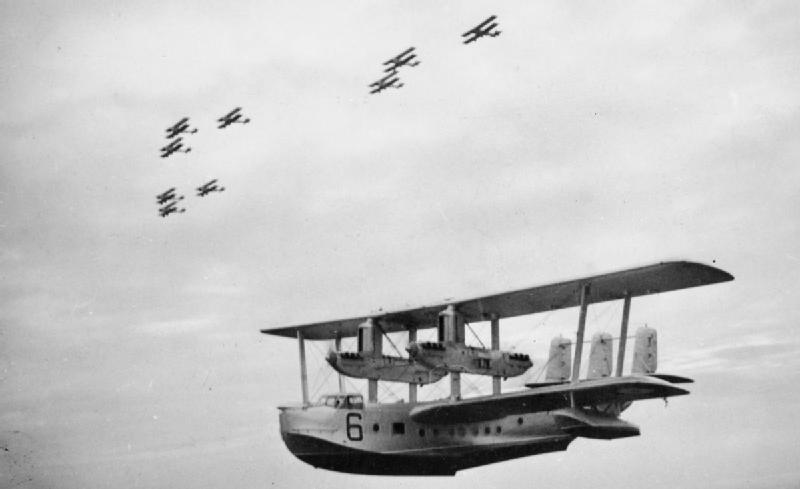
Short Singapore Mk III flying boat of 205 Sqn, in flight below three 'vic' formations of Vickers Vildebeest torpedo bombers of 100 Sqn

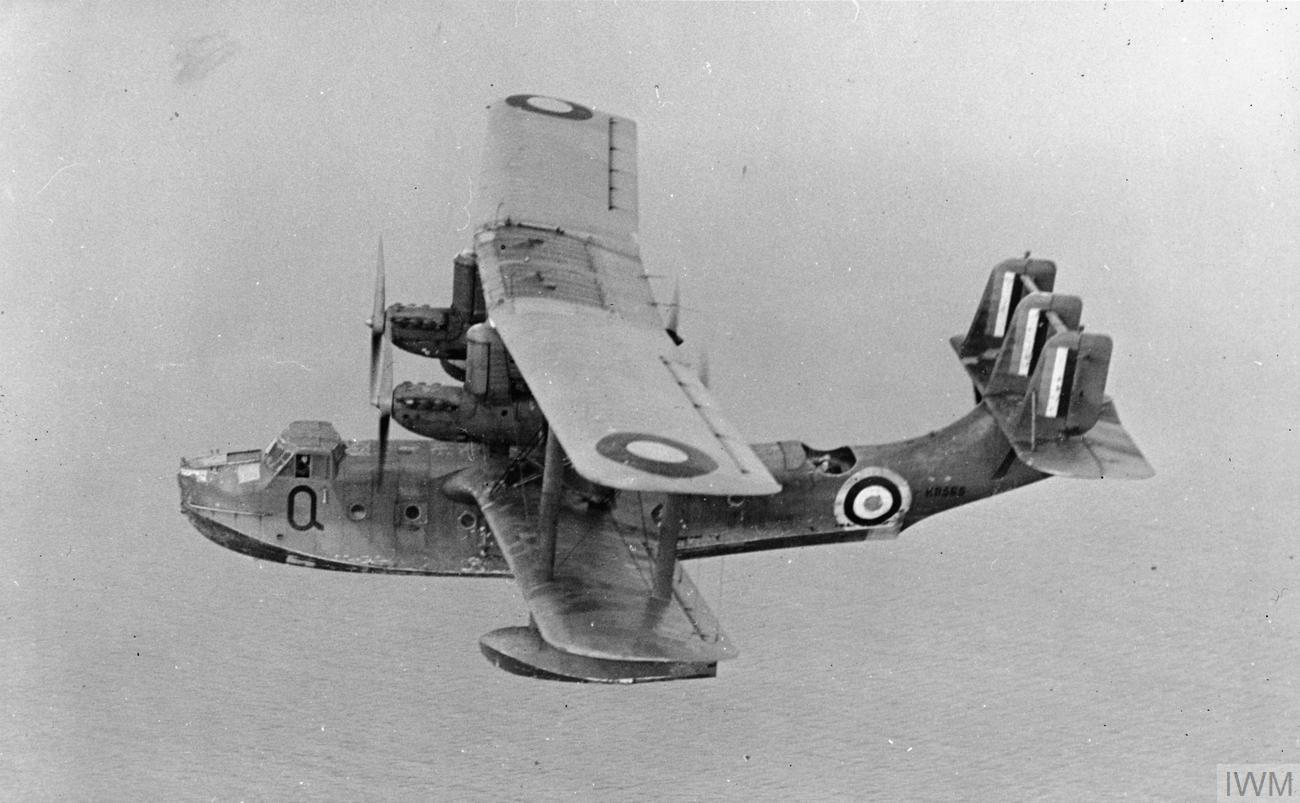
A Short Singapore Mk III flying boat, similar to those operated by 205 Sqn

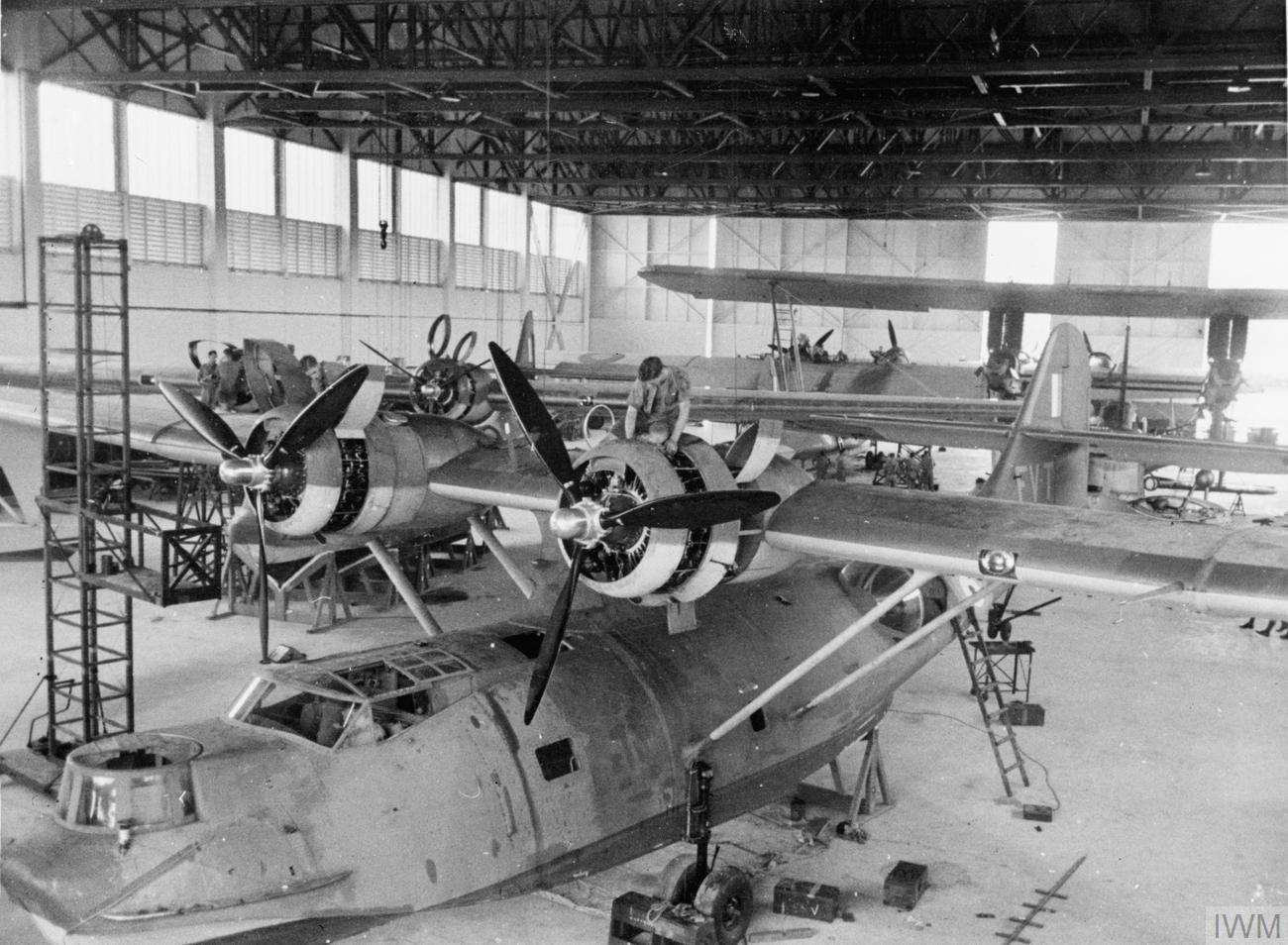
Catalina I of 205 Sqn undergoing servicing in their hangar at RAF Seletar. One of the squadron's Short Singapore Mk III biplane flying boats can be seen in the right background.

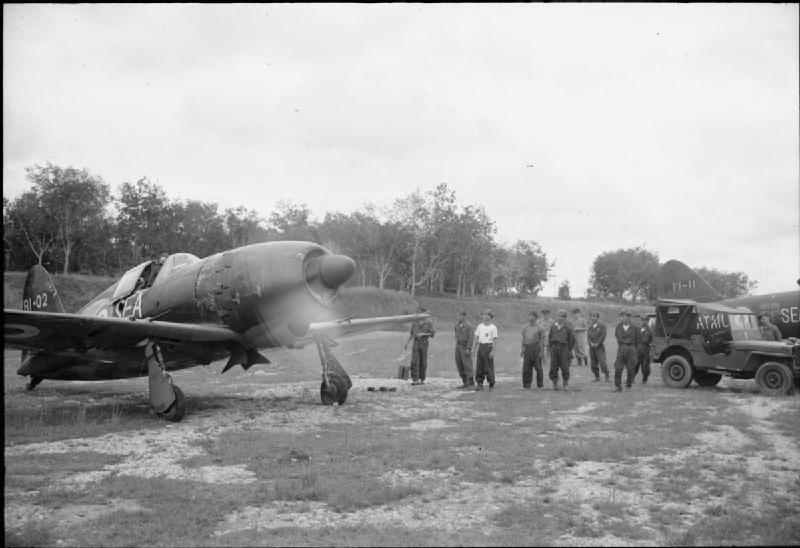
December 1945, captured Mitsubishi J2M Raiden fighters belonging to the 381st Kōkūtai of Imperial Japanese Navy Air Service being evaluated at Seletar airfield

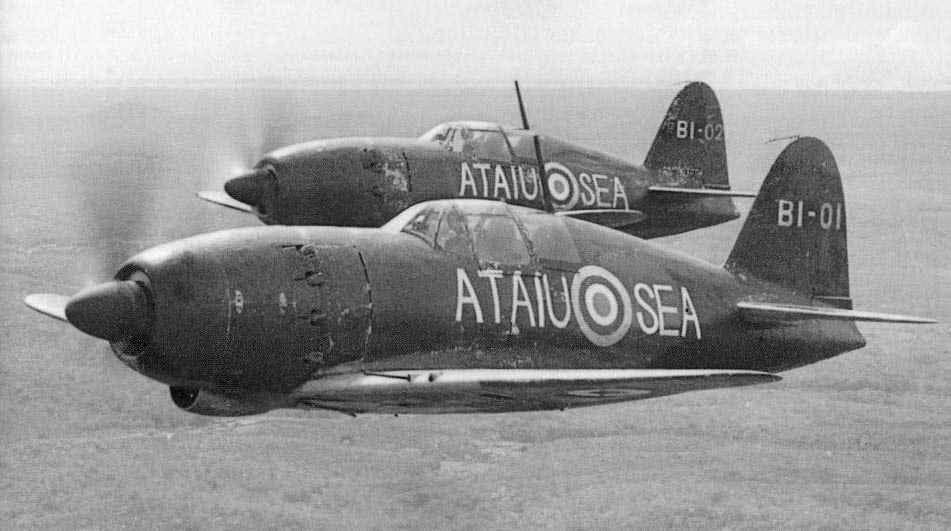
The same Mitsubishi J2M Raiden fighters being test flown by Japanese naval aviators under close supervision of RAF officers from Seletar

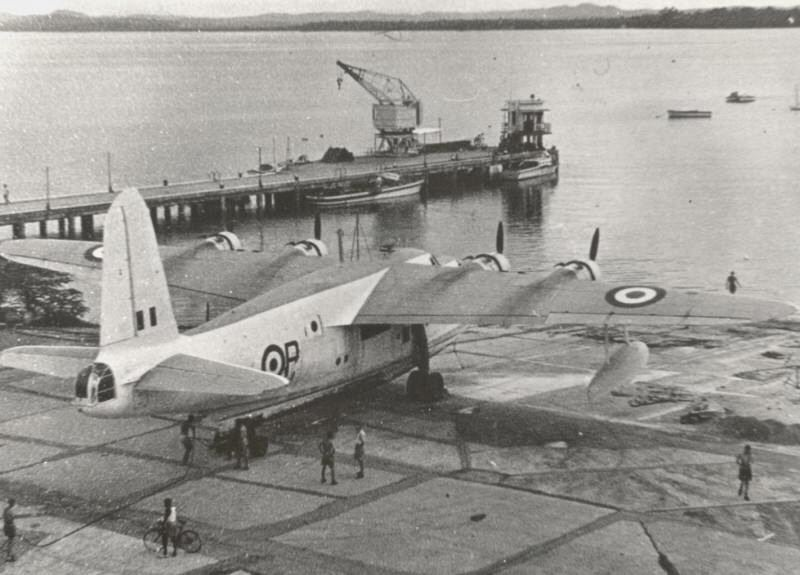
A 205 Sqn Short Sunderland Mark V ML797 "P" at the ramp of RAF Seletar. This particular airframe became the last of its type to retire from active RAF service on 30 June 1959.

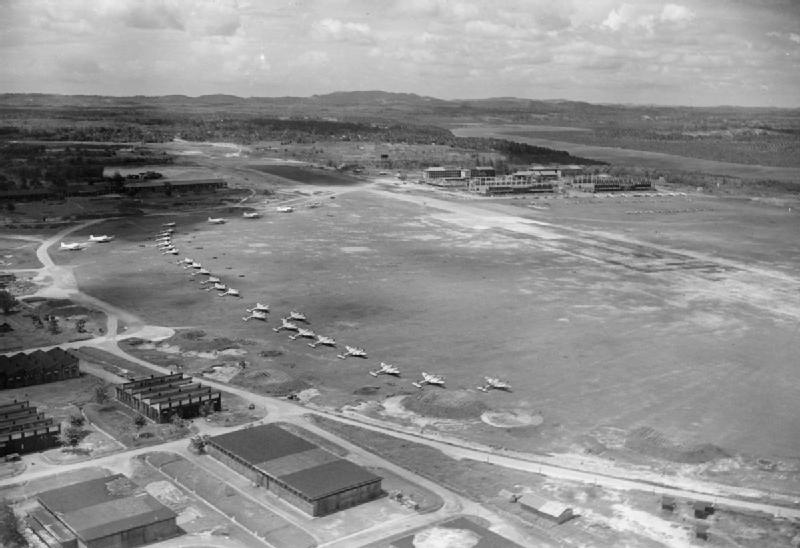
An aerial view of Seletar airfield, Singapore, with RAF Mosquito and Dakota I aircraft parked up

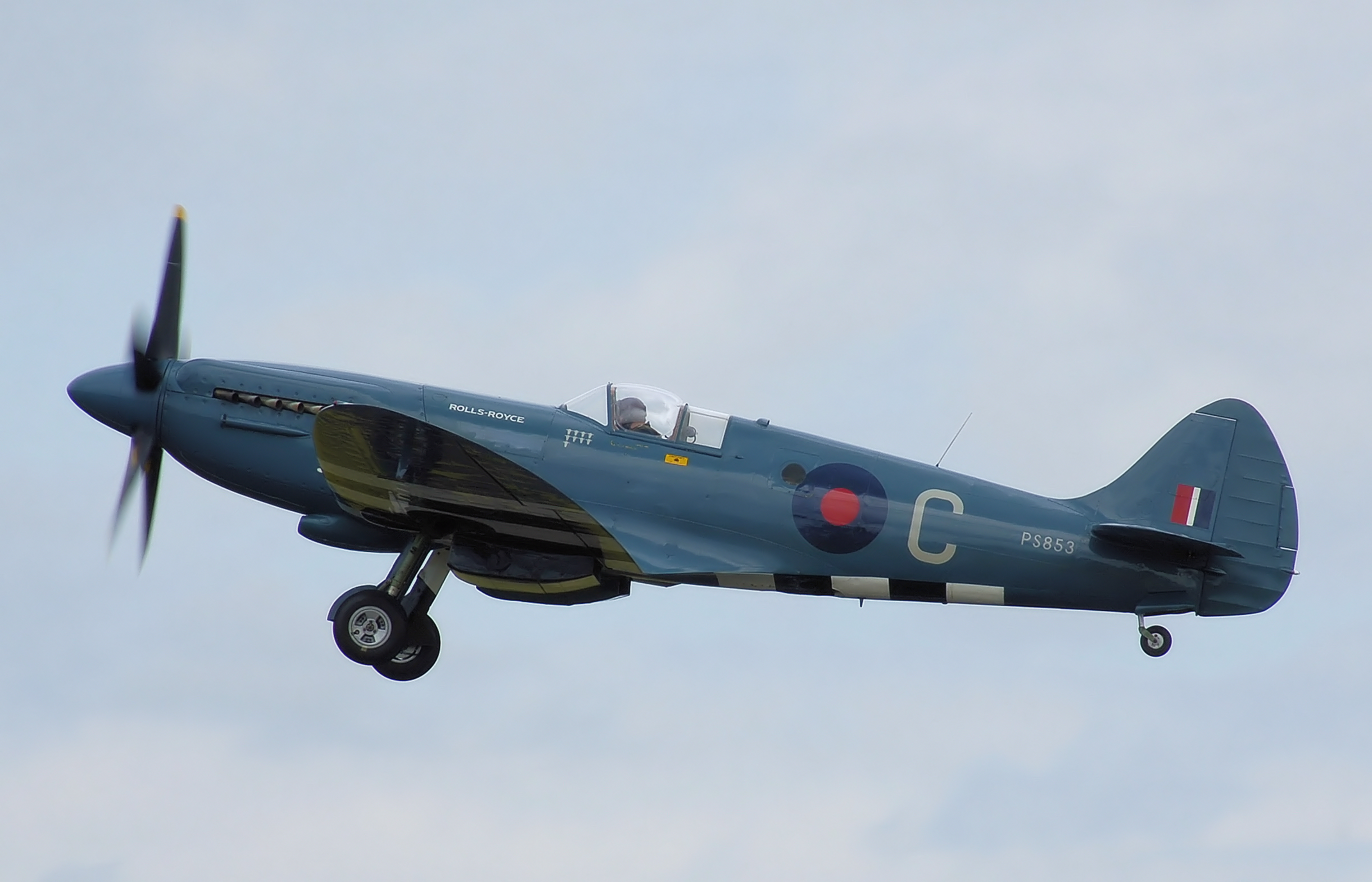
A Spitfire PR Mk 19, similar to those operated by No. 81 Squadron RAF from RAF Seletar

The viewing gallery of Singapore Youth Flying Club overlooking the runway of Seletar. Note the club's Piper Warrior taxiing on the runway.

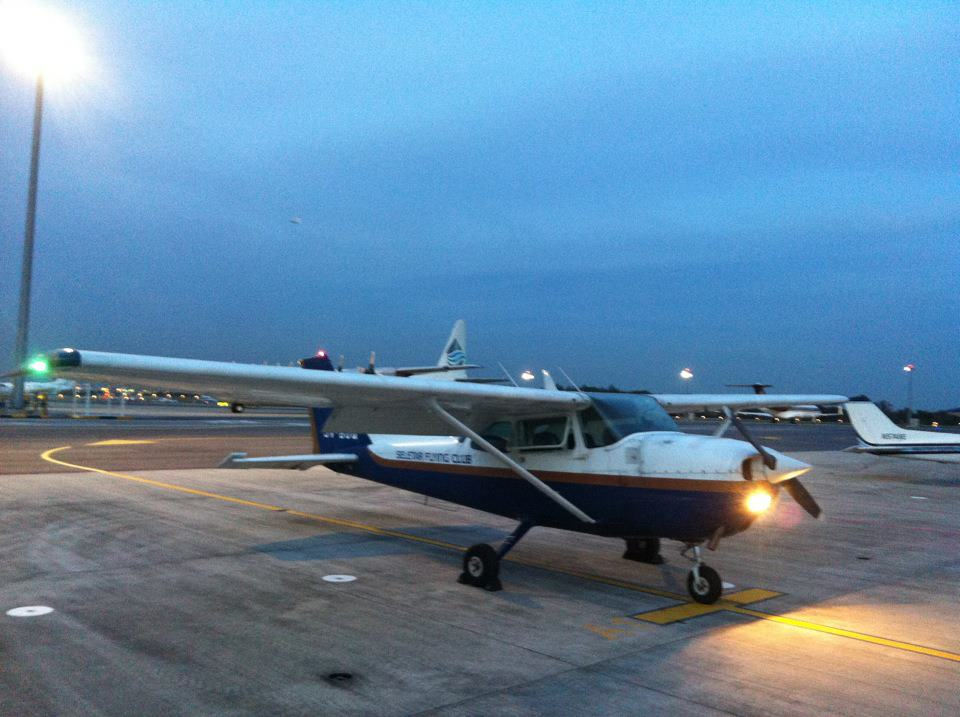
Seletar Flying Club's Cessna 172 9V-BOQ during preflight preparation for night operations

== Ground transportation ==
=== Bus ===
Two bus services (103 and 117) are available from the old airport terminal.

Since 14 October 2018, Service 102 also serves the new airport terminal of Seletar Airport, with a bus stop within the Passenger Terminal Building. Service 102 allows access to the North East Line via Sengkang and Hougang station.

Passengers heading to Changi Airport can alight at the Jalan Kayu roundabout and transfer to bus 858. Connections to Tampines, Bedok, Pasir Ris & Serangoon via services 168, 39 and 103 are also possible here.

=== Rail ===
While there are currently no Mass Rapid Transit (MRT) services in the vicinity, passengers may transfer to service 103 at Aft Baker St bus stop to head to Yishun MRT station on the North–South Line. Geographically, the closest MRT station is Sengkang MRT/LRT station on the North East Line via Thanggam LRT station on the Sengkang LRT line's West Loop.

=== Taxi ===
Taxis are available at the taxi stands located outside the departure hall. There is an additional airport surcharge for all trips originating from the airport.

=== Private transportation ===
All pick-ups by private transportation occur at the arrival pick-up point.

== See also ==
- Singapore strategy
- British Far East Command
- Far East Air Force (Royal Air Force)
- Far East Strategic Reserve
- Former overseas RAF bases
- Battle of Singapore
- Seletar Aerospace Park
- Woodbridge Hospital
- Singapore Changi Airport
