= Seletar Aerospace Park =

- Subzone of Seletar Planning Area

Name transcription(s)
- Location of Seletar Aerospace Park within Singapore
- Coordinates: 01°25′12.0″N 103°51′50.1″E
- Country: Singapore

Seletar Aerospace Park is an industrial park in Singapore catering to the aerospace industries. Located in Seletar, the S$60 million plan to develop 140 hectares of land adjacent to Seletar Airport will further strengthen Singapore's position as an aviation hub. The development of the new aerospace park is geared towards delivering additional space for industry expansion, and complement existing aerospace activities at Changi North and Loyang.

Seletar Aerospace Park will host an integrated cluster of activities such as aerospace maintenance, repair and overhaul (MRO); design and manufacturing of aerospace systems and components; business and general aviation activities, and an aviation campus for the training of pilots, aviation professionals and technical personnel.

== History ==
In May 2006, the Singapore Government together with the Economic Development Board (EDB) and JTC Corporation unveiled the plan of a new aerospace park. Decision was made when Singapore's aerospace industry has seen soaring growth potential and also a strong demand for aviation-related services. JTC Corporation was asked to carry out the master-planning and infrastructure improvements for Seletar Aerospace Park, in consultation with other government agencies. The development of the new aerospace hub is expected to take care of the industry's land needs for at least 10 years.

A master plan for Seletar Aerospace Park was announced by JTC Corporation on 26 June 2007. The Seletar Airport was upgraded to support the park, including lengthening the airport's runway and upgrading of avionics systems to allow access for bigger aircraft. Aerospace design and manufacturing companies and training schools were given additional space with new roads and infrastructure.

The development of the park would cost more than S$60 million and done in phases. The park is expected to create 10,000 jobs, predominantly skilled and technical positions and double the output of aerospace sector, from 2006's recordof S$6.3 billion.

Existing trees and open fields are conserved as much as possible and more than 30 distinctive trees will not be cut down. 204 of the existing 378 black-and-white bungalows will be conserved as well. 131 units would be used for residential purposes while the rest converted into aerospace training schools and food and beverage outlets. For the same reason,

As of 2016, according to a brochure published by JTC, there were already more than 60 MNCs and local companies in the region, with over 45,700 aircraft movements at the airport annually.

== Tenants ==
The first few tenants moved into their new premises in the third quarter of 2010. Among the front runners are Singapore Technologies Aerospace, Jet Aviation, Airbus Helicopters South East Asia and EADS Innovation Works, all with plans to expand their current facilities at Seletar.

On 20 November 2007, Rolls-Royce plc announced plans to build its first Asian aero engine facility in the Park, slated for completion by end 2009. The facility will complement its existing facility at Derby by concentrating on the assembly and testing of large civil engines such as the Trent 1000 and Trent XWB. It is expected to provide employment for about 330 people, out of a total of 1,600 employees based in Singapore.

On 15 February 2015, jet engine manufacturer Pratt & Whitney officially opened its first Singapore manufacturing facility.

Airbus Asia Training Centre moved from Singapore Airlines's training centre to its new location in the park on 18 April 2016.

== Amenities ==
The Seletar Aerospace Park has several buildings from the British colonial days, that have been preserved and revamped into dining outlets offering different styles of fares, from European to local dishes.

Thirty-two colonial houses have been conserved and redeveloped as part of 'The Oval at Seletar Aerospace Park'.

== See also ==
- Seletar Airport
