= List of Singapore LRT stations =

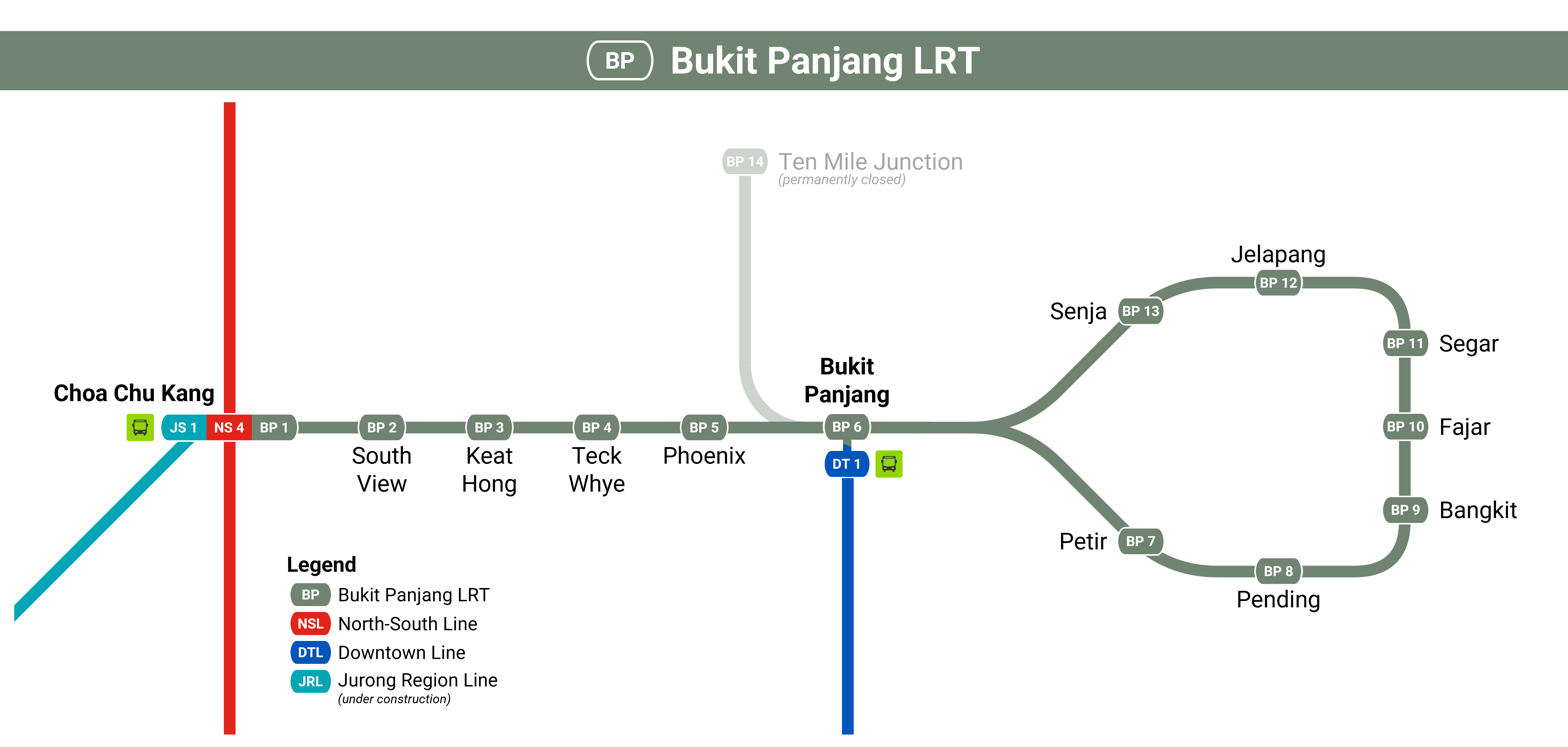
Map of the Bukit Panjang LRT line (BPLRT) (Note: Note that the current map displays the BPLRT route differently. For illustrative purposes, this illustration is based on the old map, which features Ten Mile Junction.)

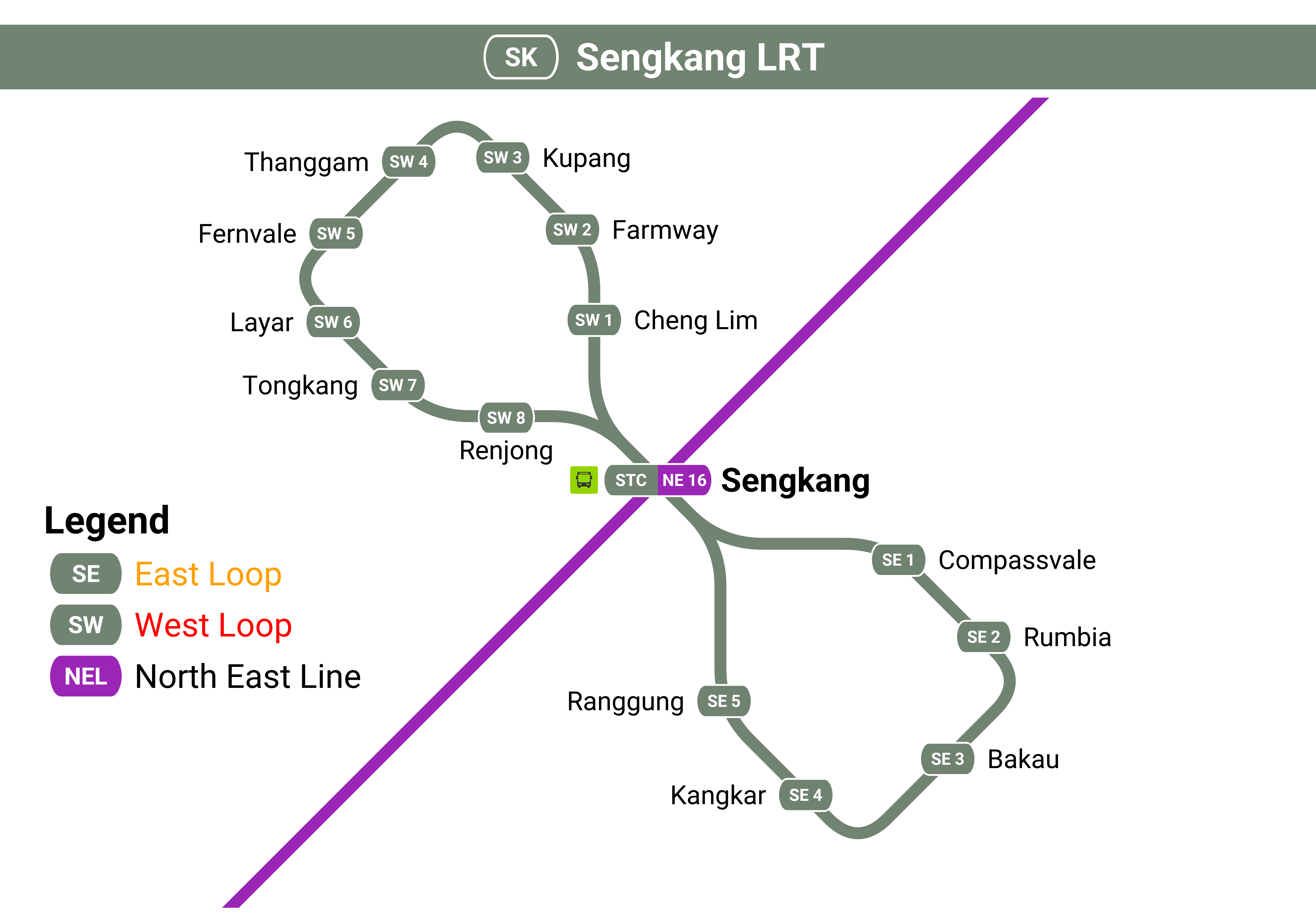
Map of the Sengkang LRT line (SKLRT)

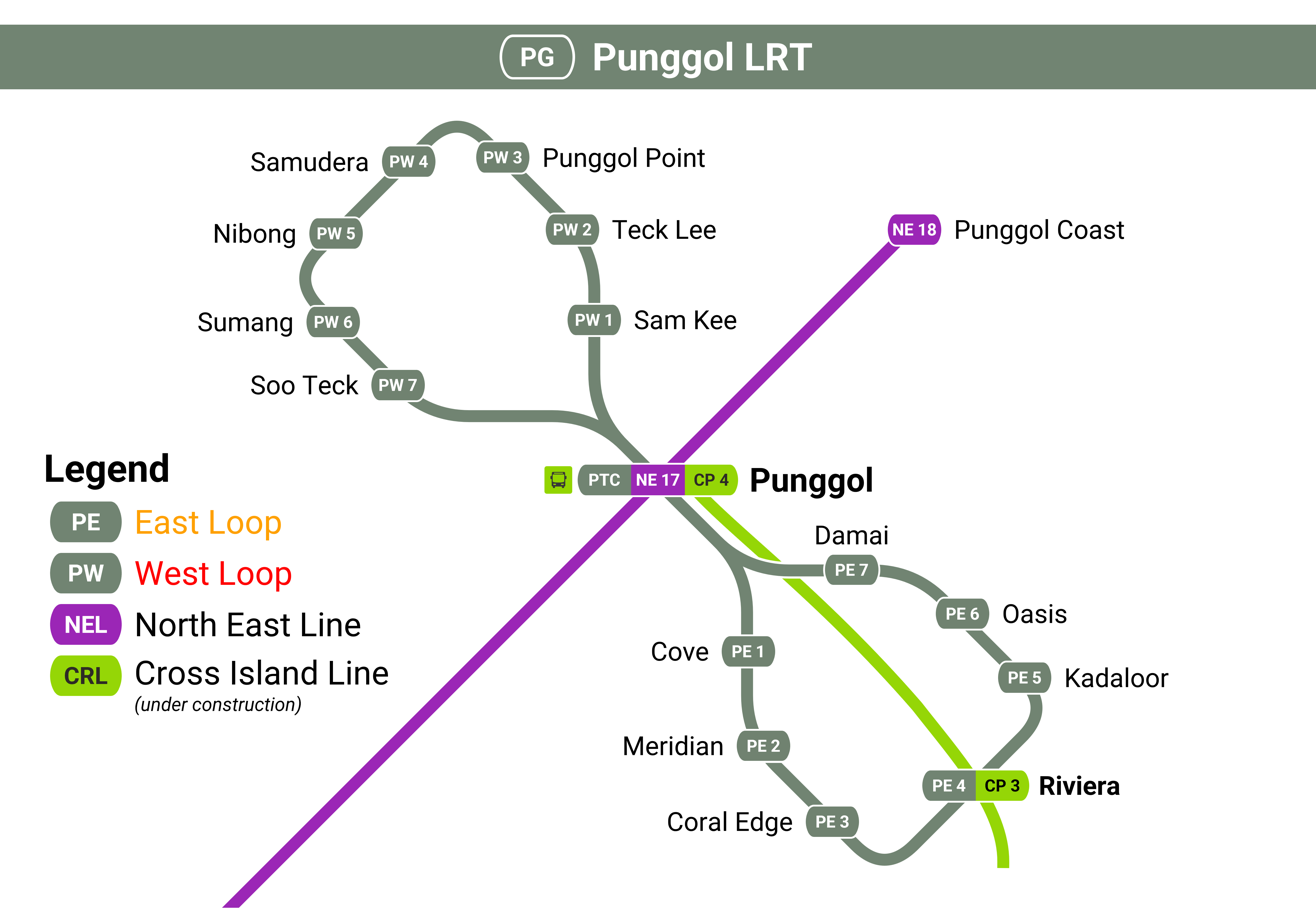
Map of the Punggol LRT line (PGLRT)

The Light Rail Transit (LRT) system (Note: Malay: Sistem Rel Ringan, Chinese: 轻轨列车系统, Tamil: இலகு கடவு ரயில்) is a series of local automated guideway transit lines in Singapore. Owned by the Land Transport Authority (LTA), the system has three lines: the Bukit Panjang LRT line (BPLRT), the Sengkang LRT line (SKLRT), and the Punggol LRT line (PGLRT). The BPLRT, operated by SMRT Trains, serves the residential estates of Bukit Panjang and Choa Chu Kang, whilst the Sengkang and Punggol LRT lines (SPLRT), operated by SBS Transit, serve the estates of Sengkang and Punggol, respectively. Spanning 26.5 kilometres (16.5 mi), the system acts as a feeder service for the country's Mass Rapid Transit (MRT) system. As of 2023, the LRT system serves an average of 202,000 passengers per day.

Plans for the LRT system were conceptualised in 1991, in anticipation of Singapore's population reaching four million. In 1994, it was announced by Communications Minister Mah Bow Tan that an LRT line would be built in Bukit Panjang. In August 1996, Prime Minister Goh Chok Tong announced that as part of the Punggol 21 housing concept, a housing plan for Punggol intended to serve as "a model for new towns in the 21st century", an LRT line would be built in Punggol. A month later, Goh also announced that as part of developments for the Sengkang estate, an LRT line would be built there.

The BPLRT opened on 6 November 1999 with 14 stations. The east loop for the SKLRT opened on 18 January 2003. The east loop for the PGLRT opened on 29 January 2005, with the exception of Oasis and Damai stations, which opened later on 15 June 2007 and 20 June 2011, respectively. The west loop for Sengkang opened on 29 January 2005 with the exception of Farmway, Cheng Lim, and Kupang stations, which opened later on 15 November 2007, 1 January 2013, and 27 June 2015, respectively. The PGLRT's west loop began operating on 29 June 2014 with Nibong, Sumang, and Soo Teck stations. Sam Kee, Punggol Point, and Samudera on the PGLRT's west loop opened on 29 February 2016, 29 December 2016, and 31 March 2017, respectively. Ten Mile Junction station on the BPLRT closed on 13 January 2019 due to low ridership. Teck Lee station on the PGLRT's west loop opened on 15 August 2024.

As of July 2025, there are 42 LRT stations in operation, all of which are elevated stations and have wheelchair accessibility. All stations in operation have fixed platform barriers, which were added to prevent commuters from falling onto the tracks. There are 13 stations on the BPLRT, 14 on the SKLRT, and 15 on the PGLRT. The BPLRT starts from Choa Chu Kang and goes to the east until Bukit Panjang station, where it loops between Petir and Senja stations in both directions before going back to Choa Chu Kang. There was a branch loop service to Ten Mile Junction via Bukit Panjang and Senja when Ten Mile Junction was in operation. Within the SPLRT, the SKLRT and PGLRT have a loop on their termini's east and west side. There are 8 stations on the SKLRT's west loop and 5 stations on its east loop, with Sengkang station as the terminus for both loops. Trains services run in both directions for both loops. Next to Sengkang station is Punggol station, which is the terminus for both of the PGLRT's loops. There are 7 stations on its west loop and 7 stations on its east loop. Trains services run in both directions for both loops. There are 4 LRT stations that interchange with MRT lines, being Choa Chu Kang with the North–South Line, Bukit Panjang with the Downtown Line, and Sengkang and Punggol with the North East Line. These 4 are also the only LRT stations to be connected to bus interchanges. There are 3 stations planned to interchange with upcoming MRT lines, being Choa Chu Kang with the Jurong Region Line and Punggol and Riviera with the Cross Island Line.

== Stations ==
* Transfer station
** Transfer station and terminus
Bus interchange

=== In operation ===
Stations that are in operation, with their Chinese, Malay, and Tamil names, along with their transport connections and locations
Station name			Station code (Note: Station codes with a dash between them represent a tap-out transfer.)	Line	Opened (Note: This column refers to the date the station opened. It does not include dates for future lines, renovations, or platform additions, which can be found in the articles for the individual stations.)	Planning area (Note: Taken from the Urban Redevelopment Authority's 2019 Masterplan)	Connections	Ref(s)
English / Malay	Chinese	Tamil	Station code	Line	Opened	Planning area	Connections	Ref(s)
Bakau	码高	பக்காவ்	SE3	Sengkang LRT	18 January 2003	Sengkang		
Bangkit	万吉	பங்கிட்	BP9	Bukit Panjang LRT	6 November 1999	Bukit Panjang		
Bukit Panjang*	武吉班让	புக்கிட் பாஞ்சாங்	BP6 – DT1	Bukit Panjang LRT	6 November 1999	Bukit Panjang	Downtown Line; Bukit Panjang Bus Interchange	
Cheng Lim	振林	செங் லிம்	SW1	Sengkang LRT	1 January 2013	Sengkang		
Choa Chu Kang**	蔡厝港	சுவா சூ காங்	BP1 NS4	Bukit Panjang LRT	6 November 1999	Choa Chu Kang	North–South Line; Jurong Region Line (under construction); Choa Chu Kang Bus Interchange	
Compassvale	康埔桦	கம்பஸ்வேல்	SE1	Sengkang LRT	18 January 2003	Sengkang		
Coral Edge	珊瑚	கோரல் எட்ஜ்	PE3	Punggol LRT	29 January 2005	Punggol		
Cove	海湾	கோவ்	PE1	Punggol LRT	29 January 2005	Punggol		
Damai	达迈	டாமாய்	PE7	Punggol LRT	20 June 2011	Punggol		
Fajar	法嘉	ஃபஜார்	BP10	Bukit Panjang LRT	6 November 1999	Bukit Panjang		
Farmway	农道	ஃபாம்வே	SW2	Sengkang LRT	15 November 2007	Sengkang		
Fernvale	芬微	ஃபொ்ன்வேல்	SW5	Sengkang LRT	29 January 2005	Sengkang		
Jelapang	泽拉邦	ஜெலப்பாங்	BP12	Bukit Panjang LRT	6 November 1999	Bukit Panjang		
Kadaloor	卡达鲁	கடலூர்	PE5	Punggol LRT	29 January 2005	Punggol		
Kangkar	港脚	கங்கார்	SE4	Sengkang LRT	18 January 2003	Sengkang		
Keat Hong	吉丰	கியட் ஹோங்	BP3	Bukit Panjang LRT	6 November 1999	Choa Chu Kang		
Kupang	古邦	கூப்பாங்	SW3	Sengkang LRT	27 June 2015	Sengkang		
Layar	拉雅	லாயார்	SW6	Sengkang LRT	29 January 2005	Sengkang		
Meridian	丽园	மெரிடியன்	PE2	Punggol LRT	29 January 2005	Punggol		
Nibong	尼蒙	நிபொங்	PW5	Punggol LRT	29 June 2014	Punggol		
Oasis	绿洲	ஓய்சிஸ்	PE6	Punggol LRT	15 June 2007	Punggol		
Pending	秉定	பெண்டிங்	BP8	Bukit Panjang LRT	6 November 1999	Bukit Panjang		
Petir	柏提	பெட்டீர்	BP7	Bukit Panjang LRT	6 November 1999	Bukit Panjang		
Phoenix	凤凰	ஃபீனிக்ஸ்	BP5	Bukit Panjang LRT	6 November 1999	Choa Chu Kang		
Punggol**	榜鹅	பொங்கோல்	PTC NE17	Punggol LRT	29 January 2005	Punggol	North East Line; Cross Island Line Punggol Extension (under construction); Punggol Bus Interchange	
Punggol Point	榜鹅坊	பொங்கோல் பாயிண்ட்	PW3	Punggol LRT	29 December 2016	Punggol		
Ranggung	兰岗	ரங்கோங்	SE5	Sengkang LRT	18 January 2003	Sengkang		
Renjong	仁宗	ரெஞ்சோங்	SW8	Sengkang LRT	18 January 2003	Sengkang		
Riviera	里维拉	ரிவியாரா	PE4	Punggol LRT	29 January 2005	Punggol	Cross Island Line Punggol Extension (under construction)	
Rumbia	棕美	ரூம்பியா	SE2	Sengkang LRT	18 January 2003	Sengkang		
Sam Kee	三记	சாம் கீ	PW1	Punggol LRT	29 January 2005	Punggol		
Samudera	山姆	சமுத்திரா	PW4	Punggol LRT	31 March 2017	Punggol		
Segar	实加	செகார்	BP11	Bukit Panjang LRT	6 November 1999	Bukit Panjang		
Sengkang**	盛港	செங்காங்	STC NE16	Sengkang LRT	18 January 2003	Sengkang	North East Line; Sengkang Bus Interchange	
Senja	信佳	சென்ஜா	BP13	Bukit Panjang LRT	6 November 1999	Bukit Panjang		
Soo Teck	树德	சூ டெக்	PW7	Punggol LRT	29 June 2014	Punggol		
South View	南景	சவுத் வியூ	BP2	Bukit Panjang LRT	6 November 1999	Bukit Panjang		
Sumang	苏芒	சுமாங்	PW6	Punggol LRT	29 June 2014	Punggol		
Teck Lee	德利	டெக் லீ	PW2	Punggol LRT	15 August 2024	Punggol		
Teck Whye	德惠	டெக் வாய்	BP4	Bukit Panjang LRT	6 November 1999	Choa Chu Kang		
Thanggam	丹甘	தங்கம்	SW4	Sengkang LRT	29 January 2005	Sengkang		
Tongkang	同港	தொங்காங்	SW7	Sengkang LRT	29 January 2005	Sengkang		

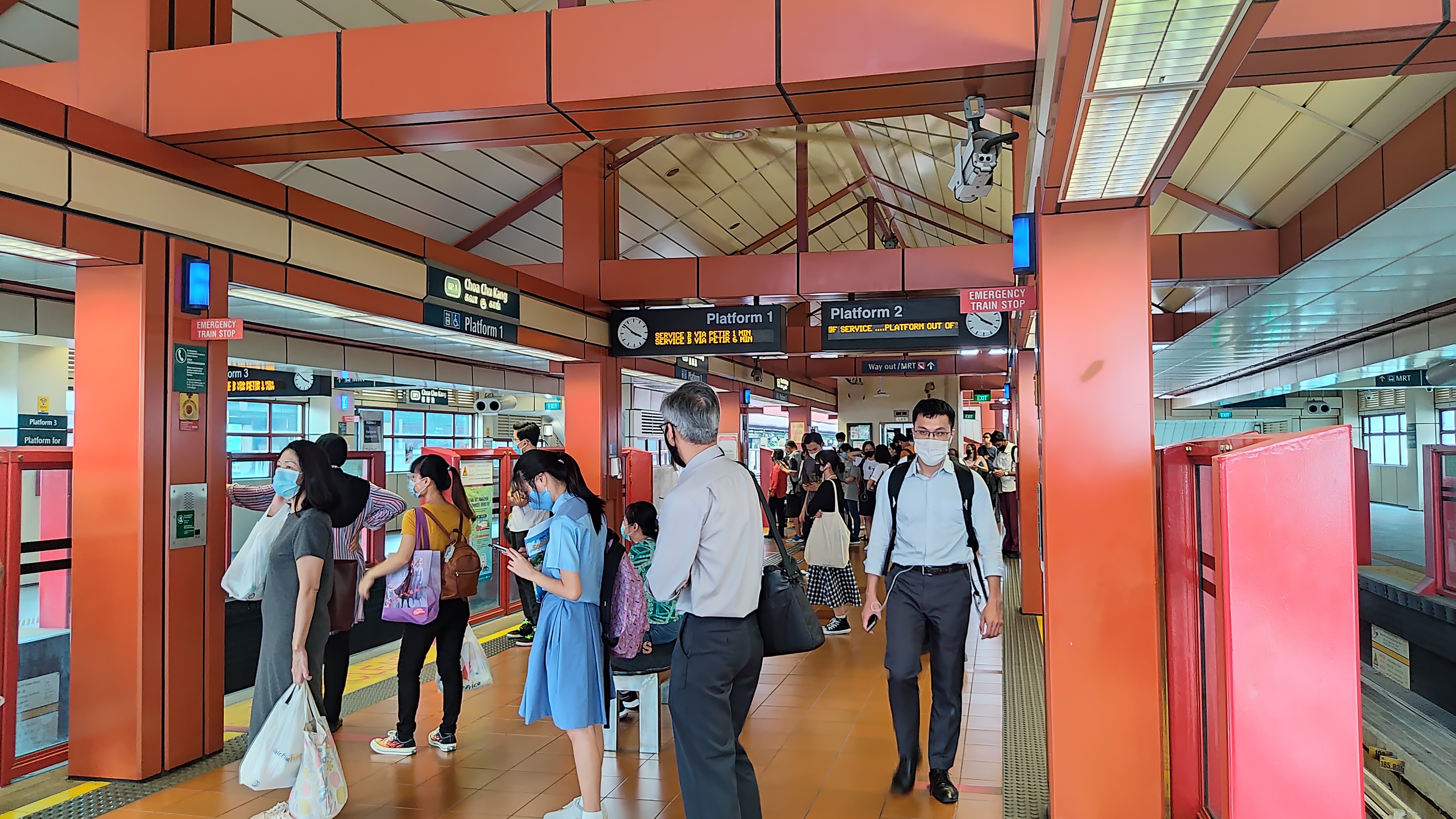
LRT platform at Choa Chu Kang station.

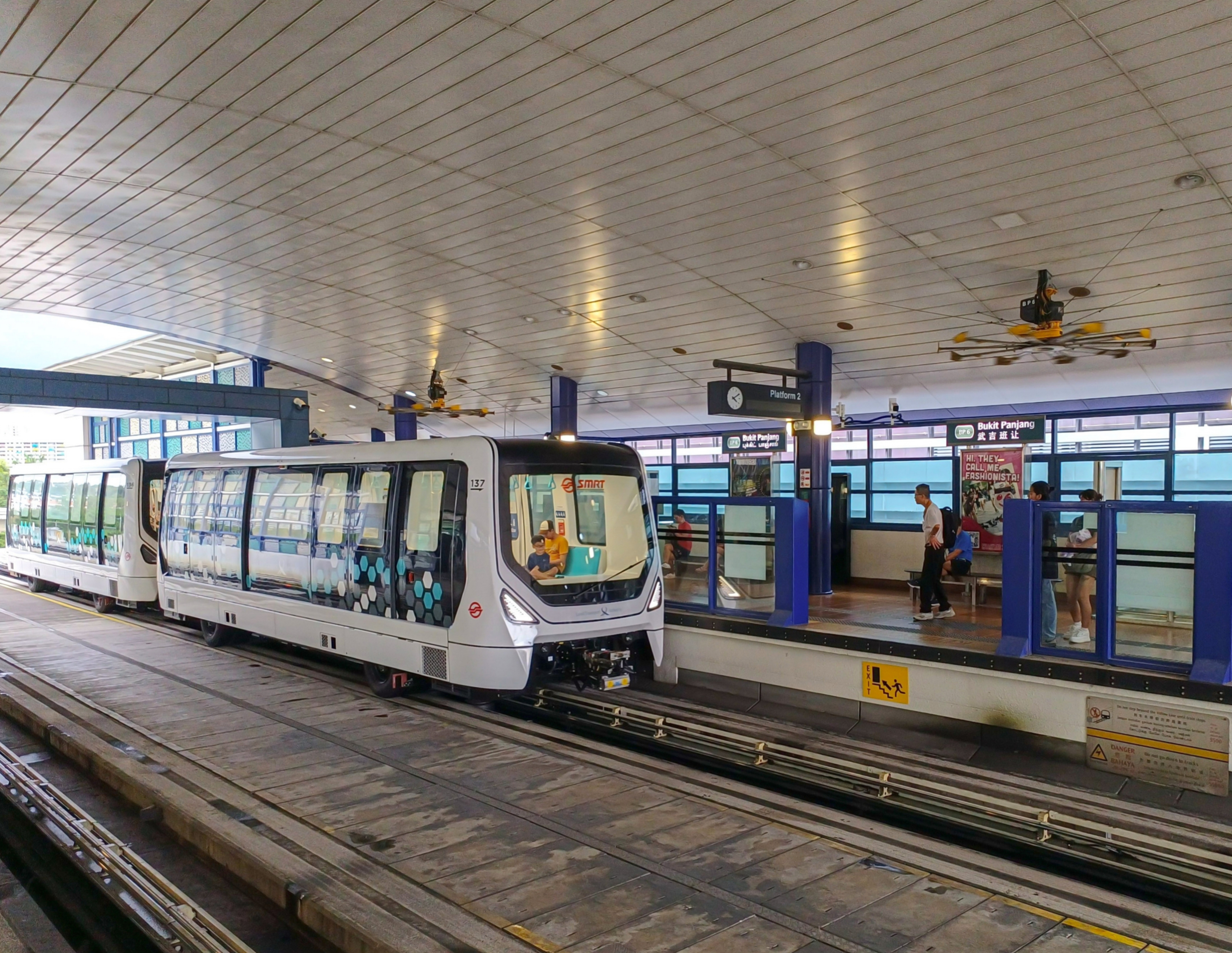
LRT platform at Bukit Panjang station

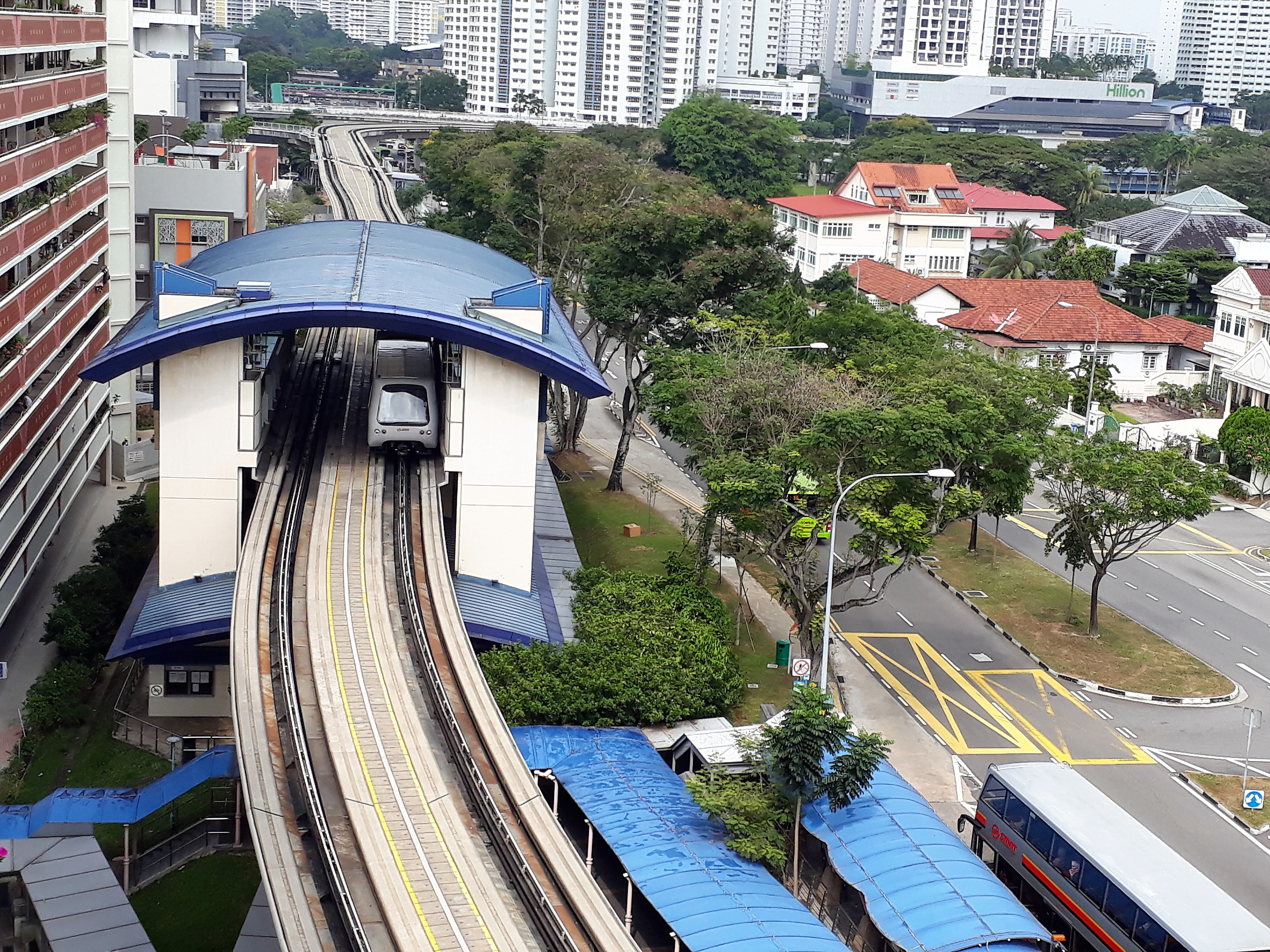
Exterior of Phoenix station

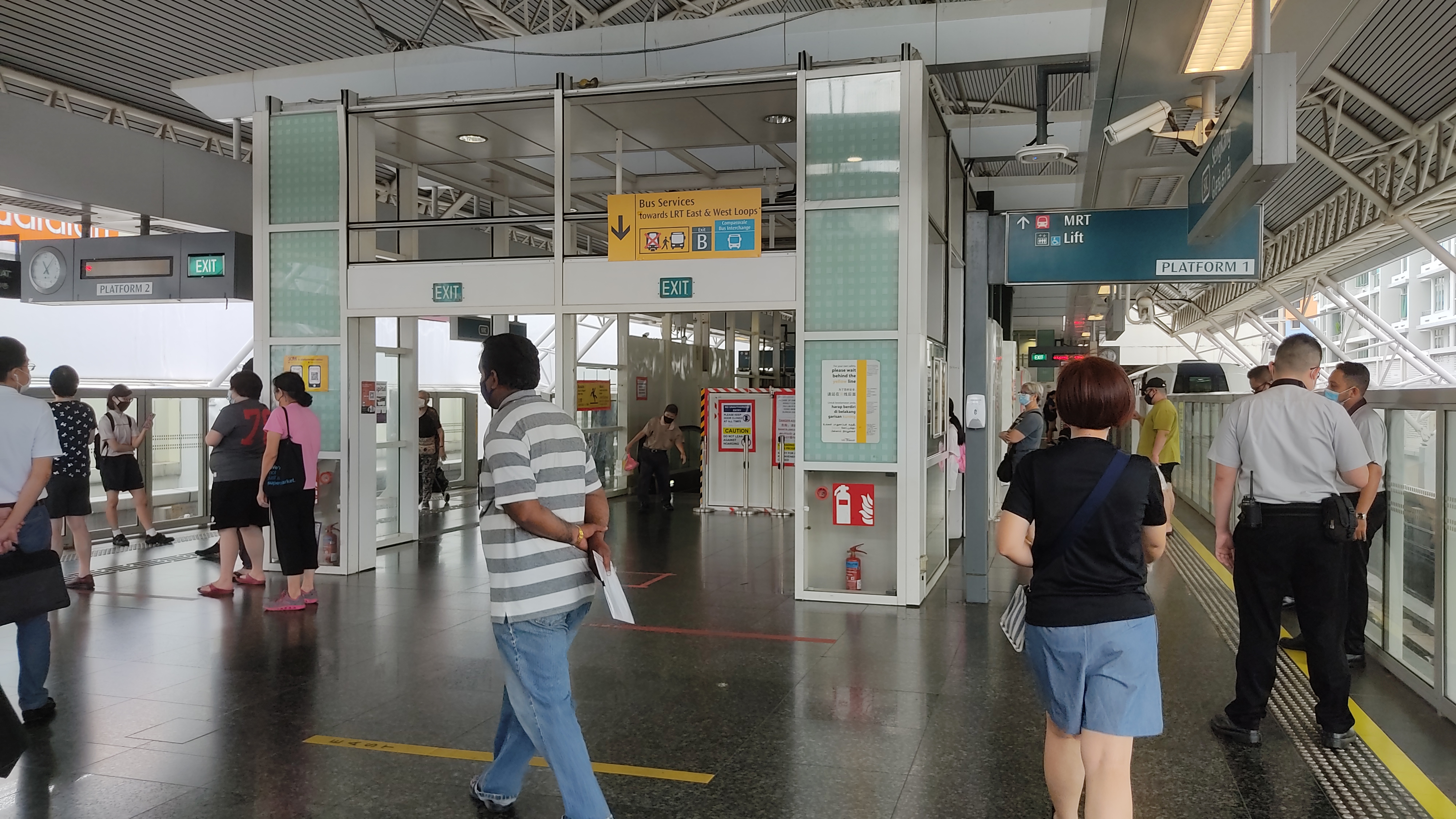
LRT platform at Sengkang station.

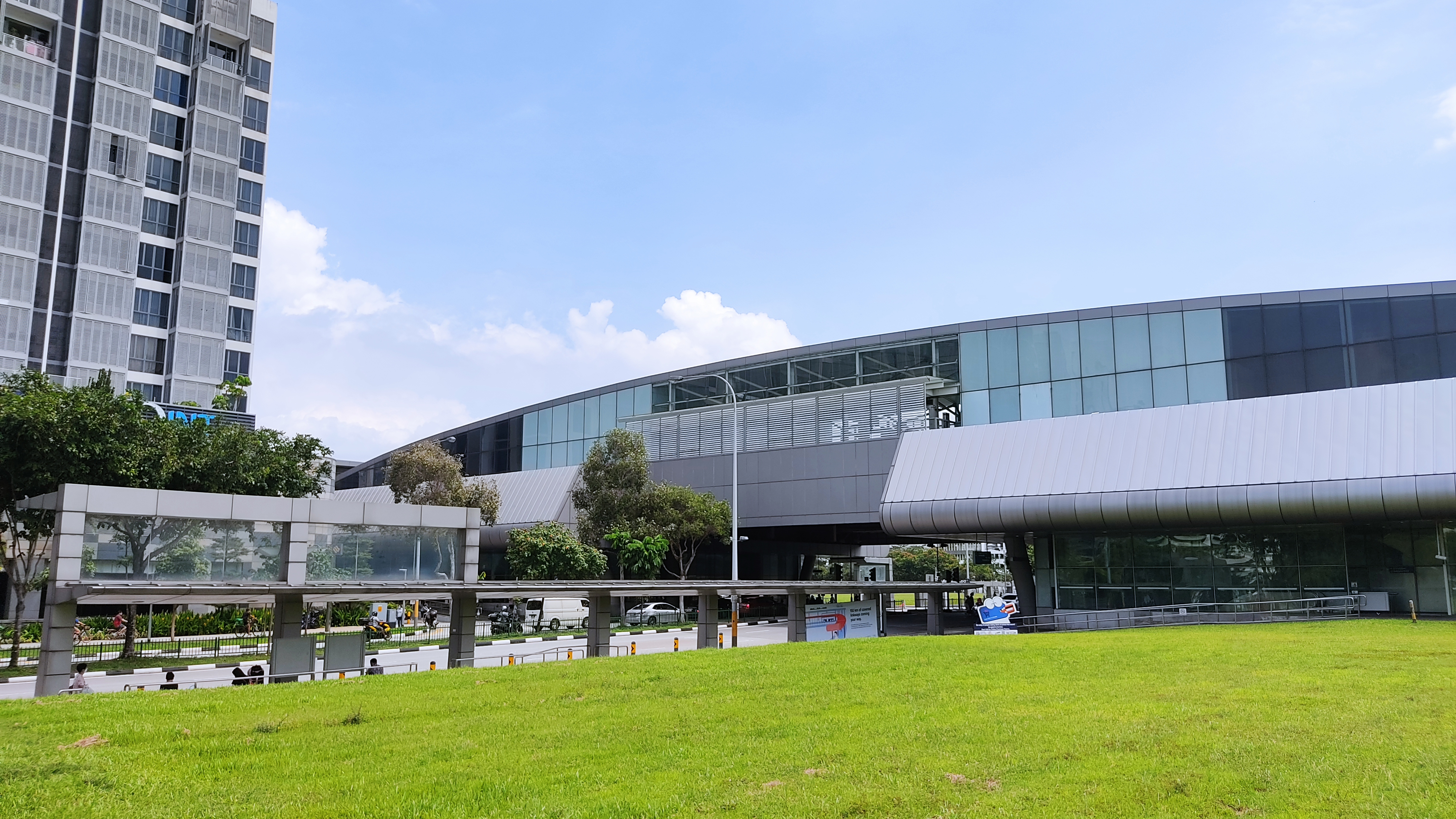
Exterior of Punggol station.

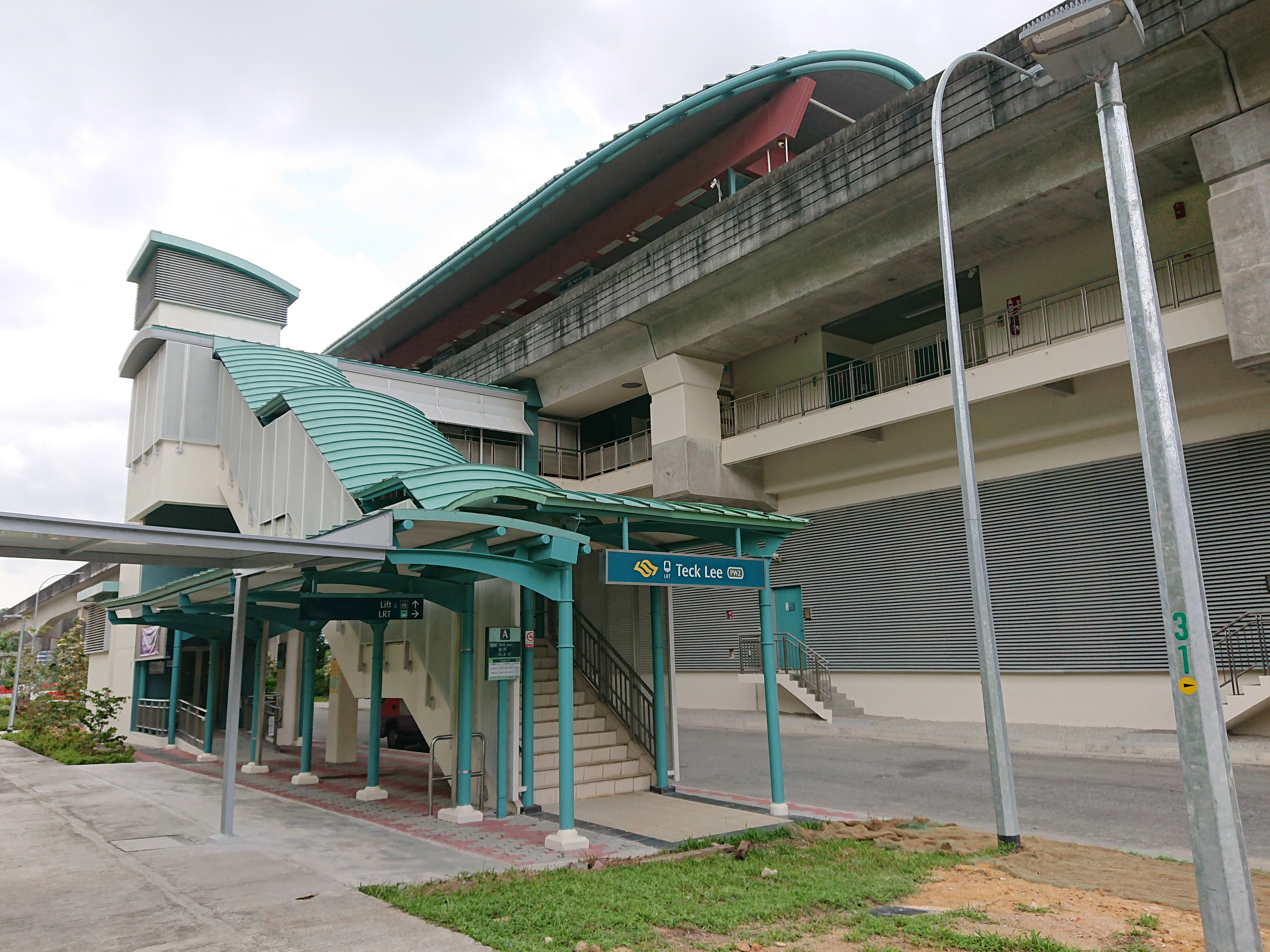
Exterior of Teck Lee station

=== Closed stations ===
Stations that are closed, with their Chinese, Malay, and Tamil names, along with their general location
Station name			Station code	Line	Opened	Closed	Planning area (Note: Taken from the Urban Redevelopment Authority's 2014 Masterplan. Note that Ten Mile Junction station was integrated with the Junction 10.)	Ref(s)
English / Malay	Chinese	Tamil	Station code	Line	Opened	Closed	Planning area	Ref(s)
Ten Mile Junction	十里广场	பத்தாம் கல் சந்திப்பு	BP14	Bukit Panjang LRT	6 November 1999	13 January 2019	Choa Chu Kang	

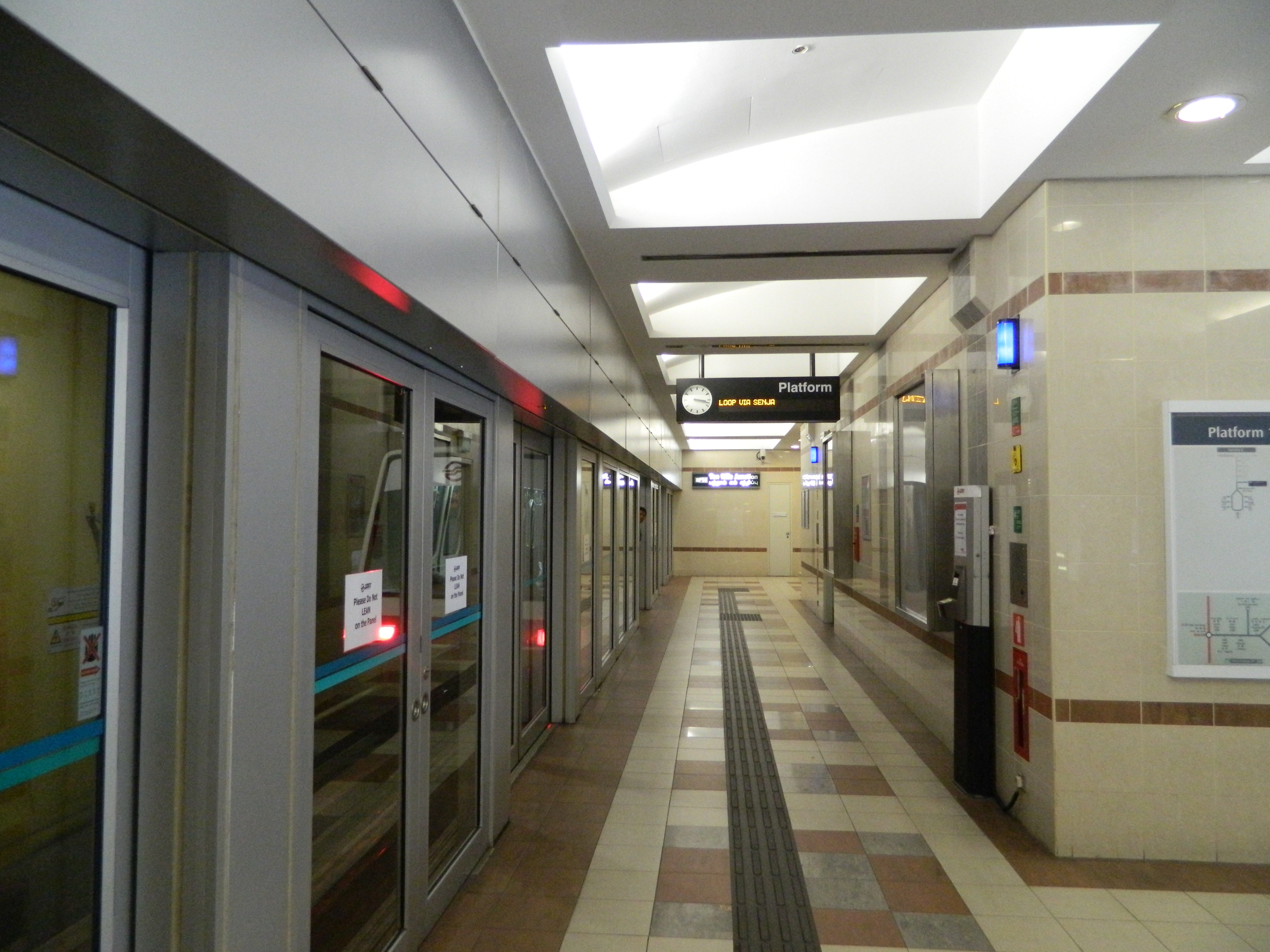
The interior of Ten Mile Junction station. As of 2019, it was planned to be converted into a stabling and testing ground for BPLRT trains.

== See also ==
- List of Singapore MRT stations
