= Sengkang Public Library =

Public library in Singapore

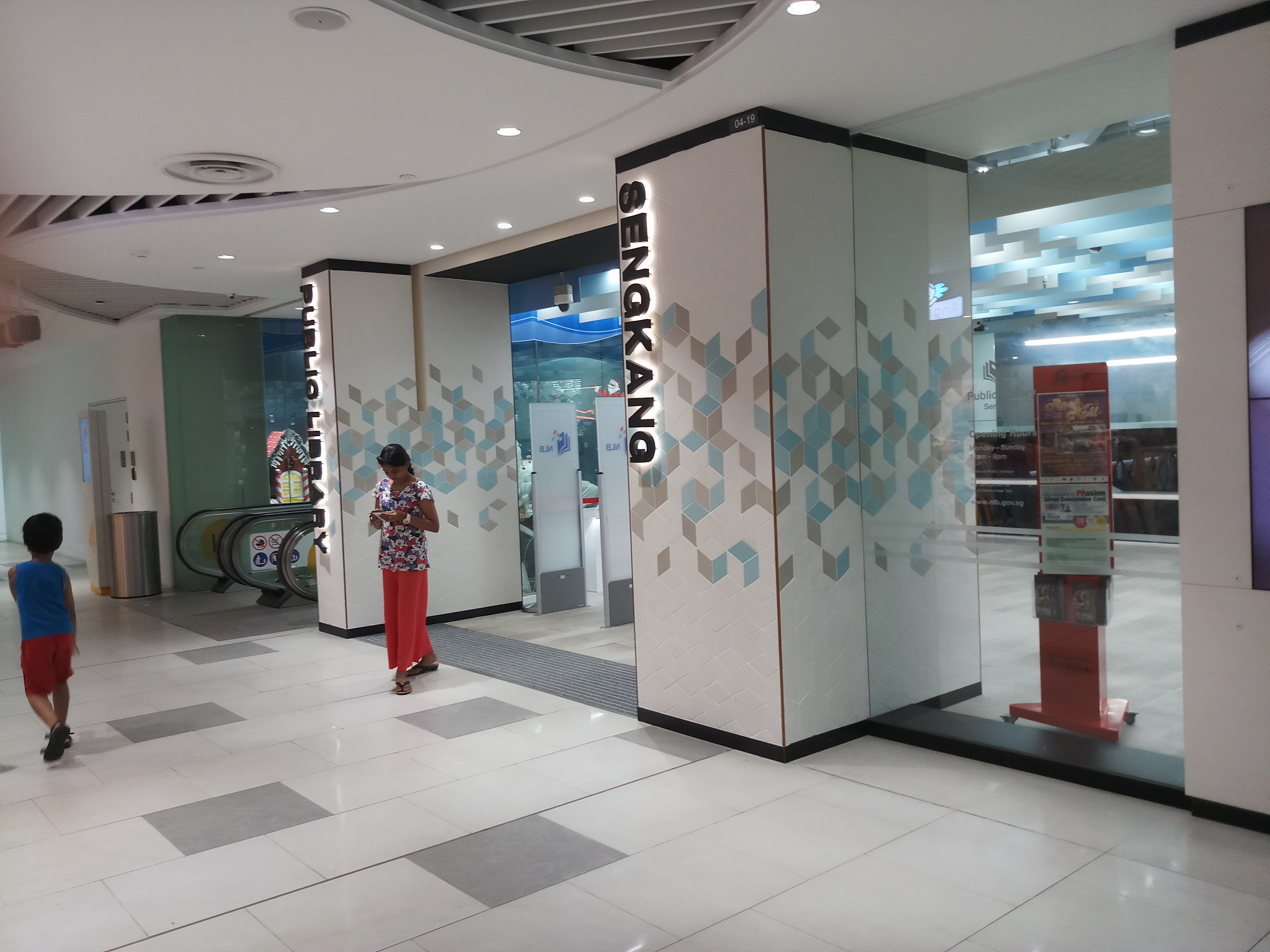
- Entrance to the library (Level 4)
- 1°23′30″N 103°53′42″E
- Location: 1 Sengkang Square, #03-28 & #04-19, Compass One, Singapore 545078, Singapore
- Type: Public library
- Established: 30 November 2002; 23 years ago
- Branch of: National Library Board

Collection
- Size: 171,751

Other information
- Website: Official Website

Sengkang Public Library is a public library owned by the National Library Board situated inside levels 3 and 4 of Compass One in Sengkang New Town. It is near Sengkang Bus Interchange and the Sengkang MRT/LRT station.

== History ==
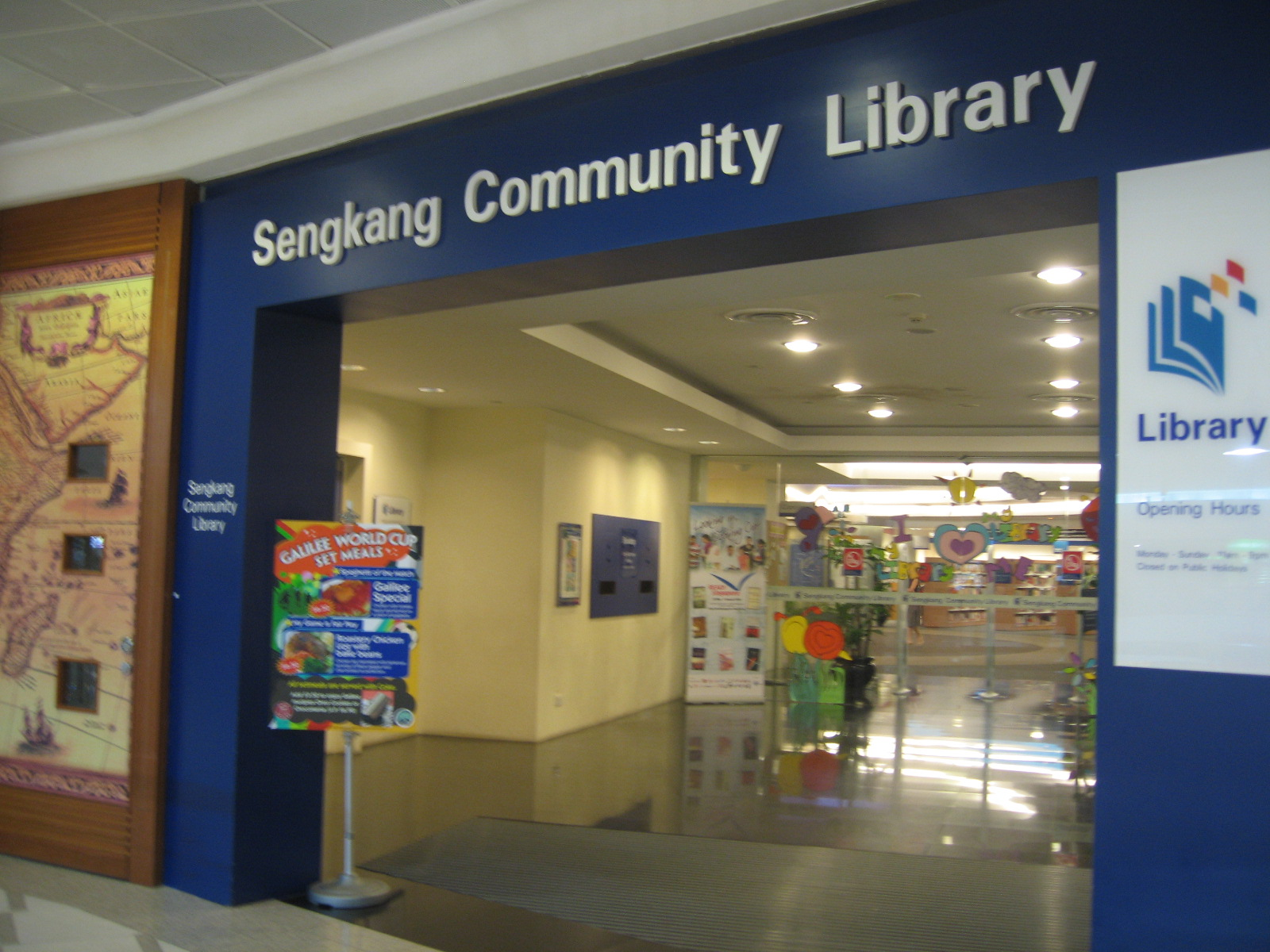
Sengkang Public Library entrance before first renovation

Originally called Sengkang Community Library, it was officially opened on 30 November 2002 by Rear-Admiral (NS) Teo Chee Hean, Senior Minister for Education and Second Minister of Defence, and Member of Parliament for Pasir Ris GRC as Singapore’s first DIY library. It used to occupy only level 4 of Compass Point (now Compass One). Its name was changed to Sengkang Public Library in 2008. It was staffed by one librarian and had a DIY concept, in which customers carry out simple transactions on their own. They could also communicate with another librarian in another library using a telephone at the library. When the population of the Sengkang and Punggol estates increased, the library was converted into a full-service library with a full-time staff. It underwent a renovation in 2013 and the children's section was improved. It was then closed for major upgrading on 18 October 2015 and reopened on 18 March 2017 by Minister for Communications and Information Yaacob Ibrahim who officiated the reopening ceremony. The library now occupies levels 3 and 4 of Compass One with 18% more space, up from the original 1809 m^{2}. It now has a new 'tween' section.

== Layout ==
Consisting of two levels, the 2136 m^{2} library serves the residents in the Sengkang, Jalan Kayu, Punggol Central and Punggol South areas. The lower level of the library contains the adult and digital collections, while the upper level contains the children's collection, magazines, and adult fiction.

=== Lower ===
- Adult nonfiction
- Digital newspapers and archives

=== Upper ===
- Adult fiction
- Magazines
  - Adult magazines
  - Children’s magazines
- Children’s nonfiction
- Children’s fiction
- Comics
- Audio Visuals
- Book drop

== See also ==
- List of libraries in Singapore
