= Compass One =

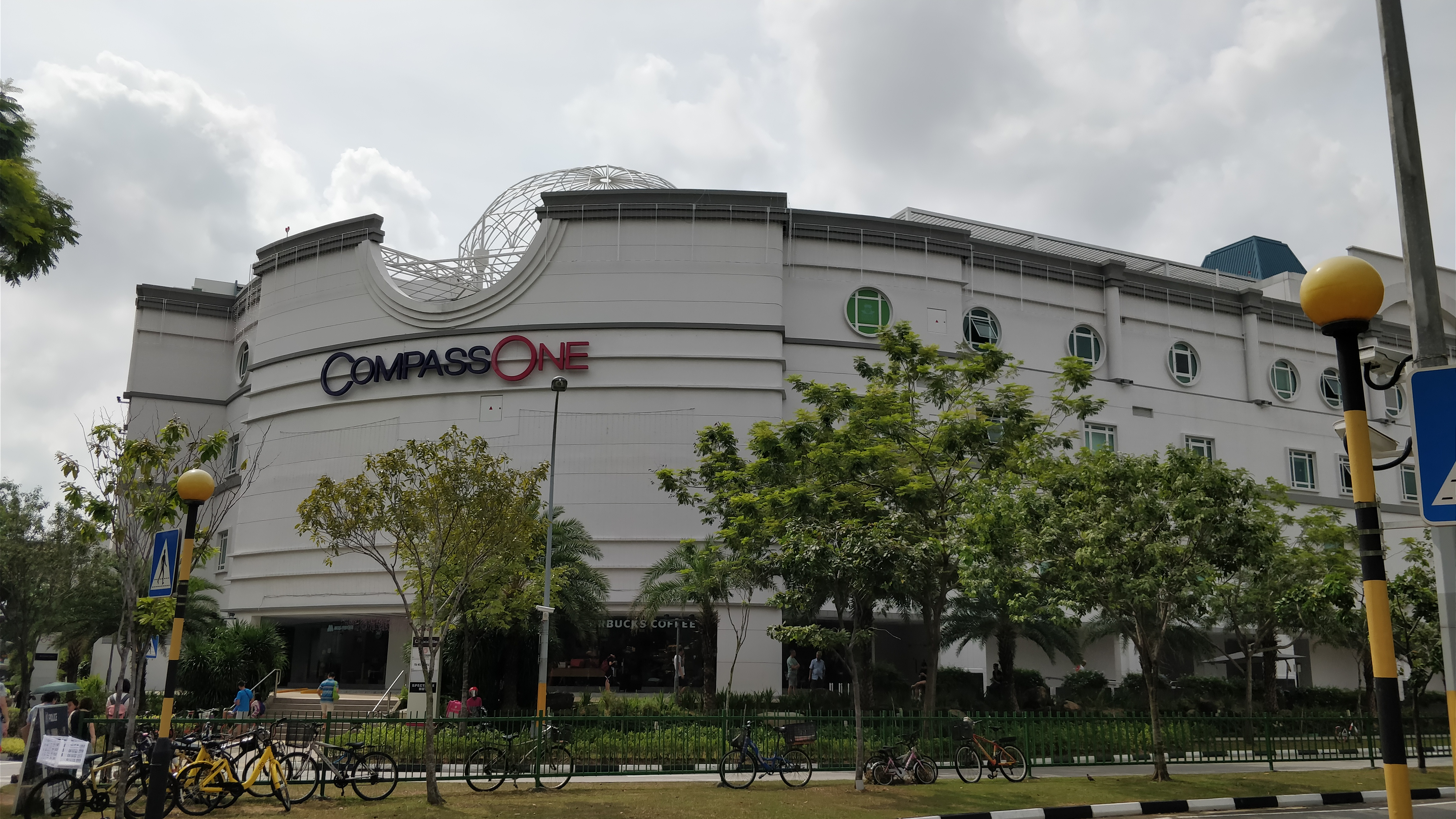
- Compass One façade
- Location: Compassvale, Sengkang, Singapore
- Coordinates: 1°23′32″N 103°53′43″E
- Address: 1 Sengkang Square, Singapore 545078
- Opened: 1 August 2002; 24 years ago (as Compass Point); 1 September 2016; 10 years ago (as Compass One)
- Developer: Frasers Centrepoint
- Manager: M&G Real Estate
- Owner: M&G Real Estate
- Num. of stores: 208
- Num. of anchor tenants: 4
- Floor area: 25,000 square metres (270,000 sq ft)
- Floors: 8 floors
- Parking: TBC
- Public transit: NE16 STC Sengkang; Sengkang
- Website: www.compassone.sg

Compass One (formerly known as Compass Point) is a suburban shopping mall located in the town centre of Sengkang, Singapore. The mall was built as an integrated development together with a condominium, Compass Heights which is located adjacent to the mall. Originally opened on 1 August 2002, the mall closed for extensive renovation works on 26 October 2015 and re-opened on 1 September 2016.

== History ==
Compass Point was built as an integrated development together with the adjacent Sengkang MRT/LRT station and Compass Heights condominium. Constructed at a cost of S$230 million, the shopping mall started operations on 1 August 2002. The shopping centre was the first major mall to open on the North East line.

Before the renovation works, the mall was Singapore's first thematic suburban shopping mall based on the theme of learning. Educational panels and informative posters are mounted on railings and walls, which feature interesting trivia based on particular themes updated periodically. After getting feedback from the public and commissioning a survey of residents in the area, conducted by international property adviser DTZ Debenham Tie Leung Limited, the mall's developer, Centrepoint Properties, proposed the learning theme for the shopping mall to cater to the predominantly young families of Sengkang New Town. The shopping mall had an approximate retail area of 269,098 square feet (25,000.0 m^{2}). Retail space was spread out over four storeys and a basement. Each storey of the shopping centre was named after the five major continents, with motifs showing different aspects of that continent, such as flora and sea transport vessels: Oceania (basement); Asia (ground storey); Europe (2nd); The Americas (3rd); and Africa (4th).

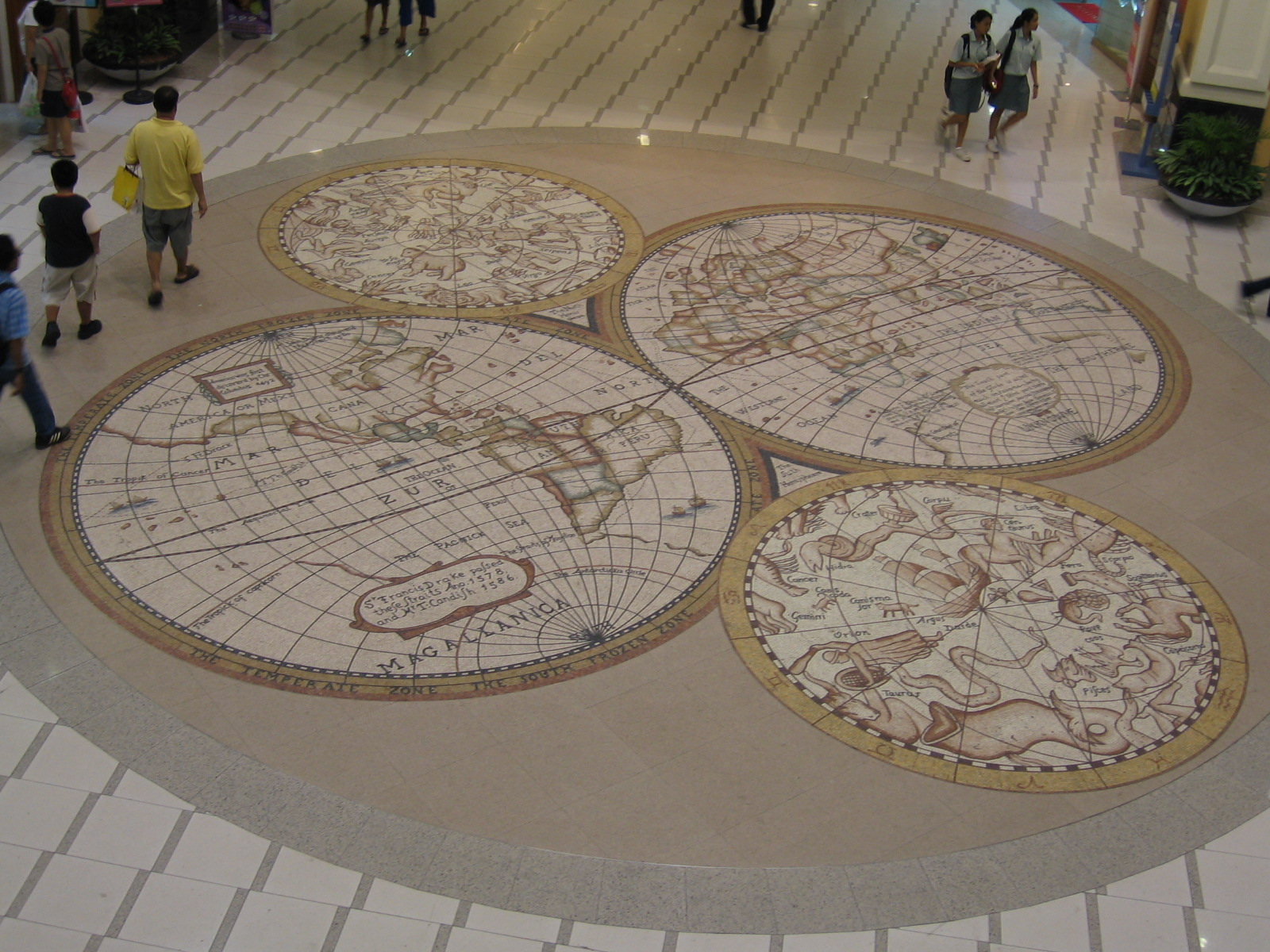
Tile floor mural in Compass Point

=== Change of ownership and renovation works ===
In December 2015, it was announced that real estate fund manager M&G Real Estate will become the sole owner of Compass Point mall in Sengkang, after entering into a deed to acquire the remaining 18.99 percent of shares owned by Frasers Centrepoint. The buyout was finalised in February 2016 and M&G Real Estate announced that the mall will reopen on 1 September 2016 after upon completion of the upgrading works under a new name and new management. The mall was called 1 Sengkang Mall after a competition on Facebook with the winner getting $1,000 in cash with the most 'likes', but was officially renamed Compass One by the management after the public wanted to stick to the original name.

Compass One reopened on 1 September 2016 with a new interior design, 180 specialty tenants and a redesigned interior layout. The Sengkang Public Library, which opened on 18 March 2017, occupies a portion of Levels 3 and 4. There is a play deck that consists of a wet and dry playground at Level 4.

== Access ==
Compass One Shopping Mall is located next to the Sengkang MRT/LRT station, Sengkang Bus Interchange and Compassvale Bus Interchange.

== Gallery (as Compass Point) ==
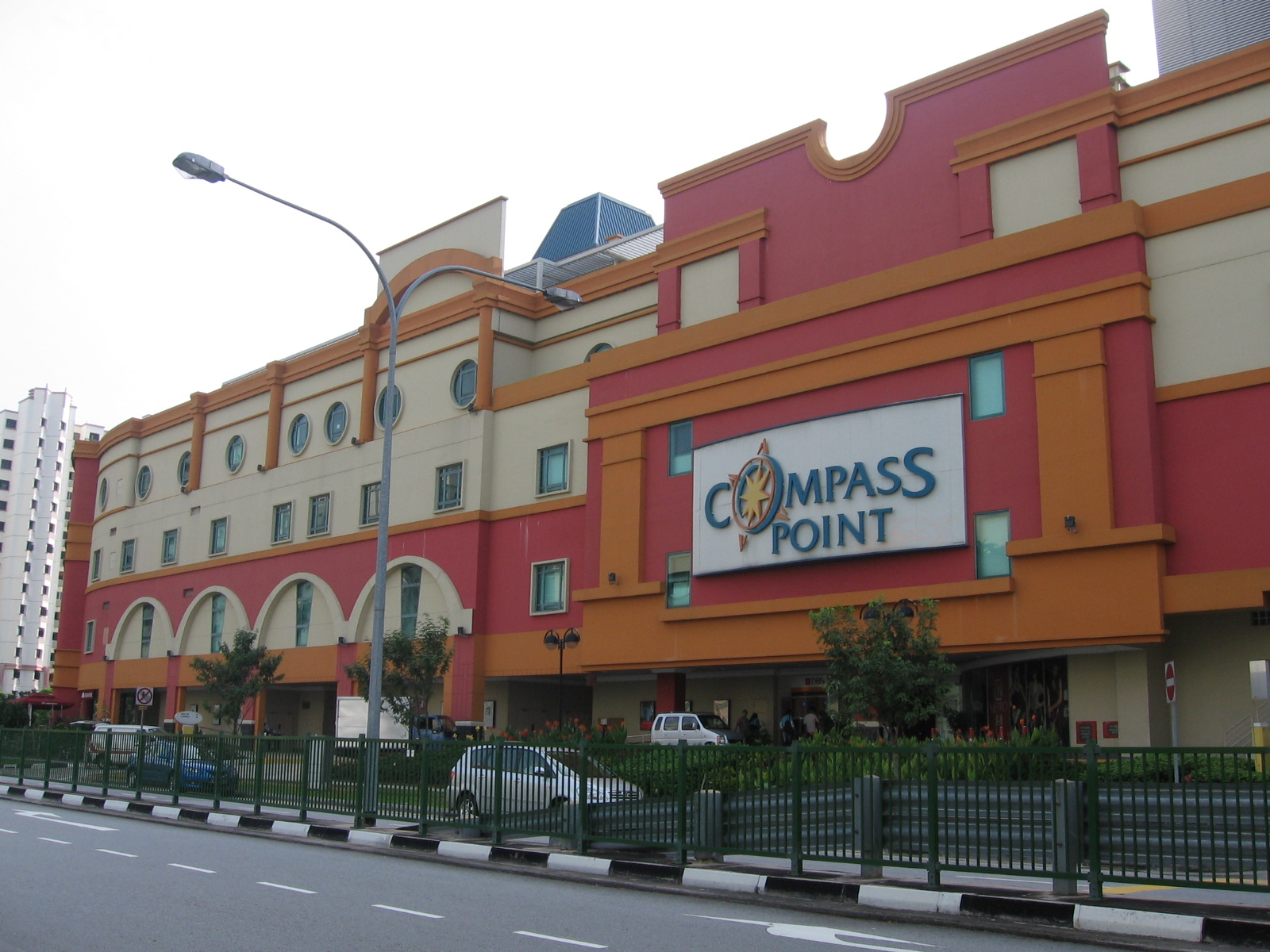
Main entrance of the mall in November 2005

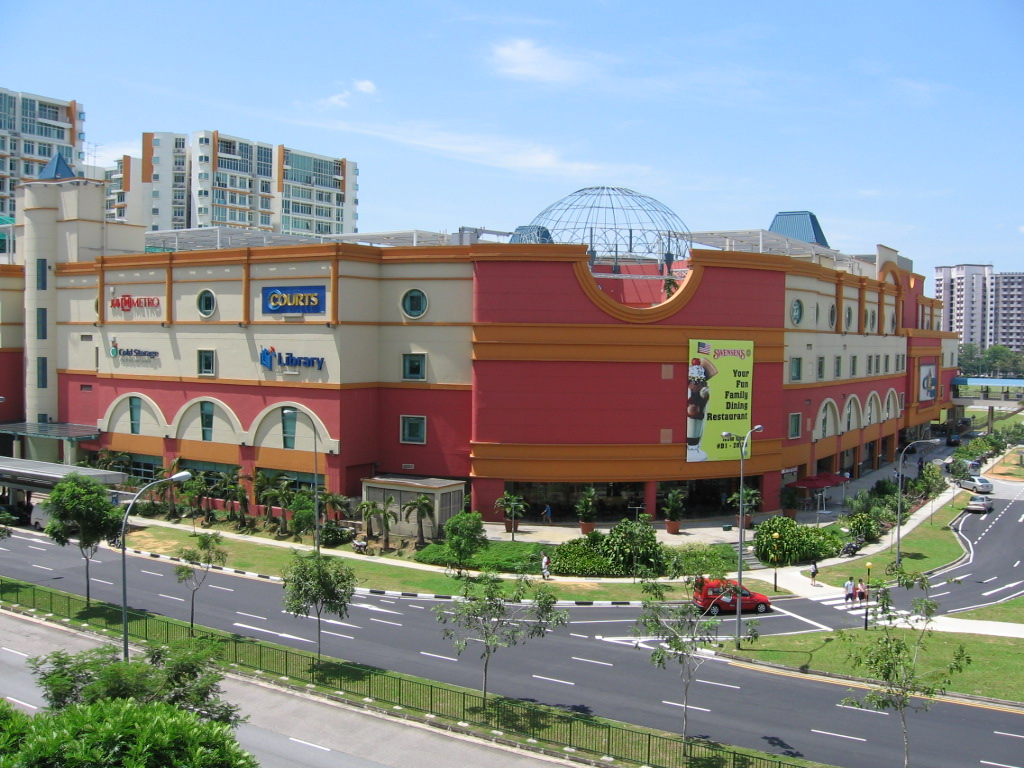
Compass Point before the upgrading works

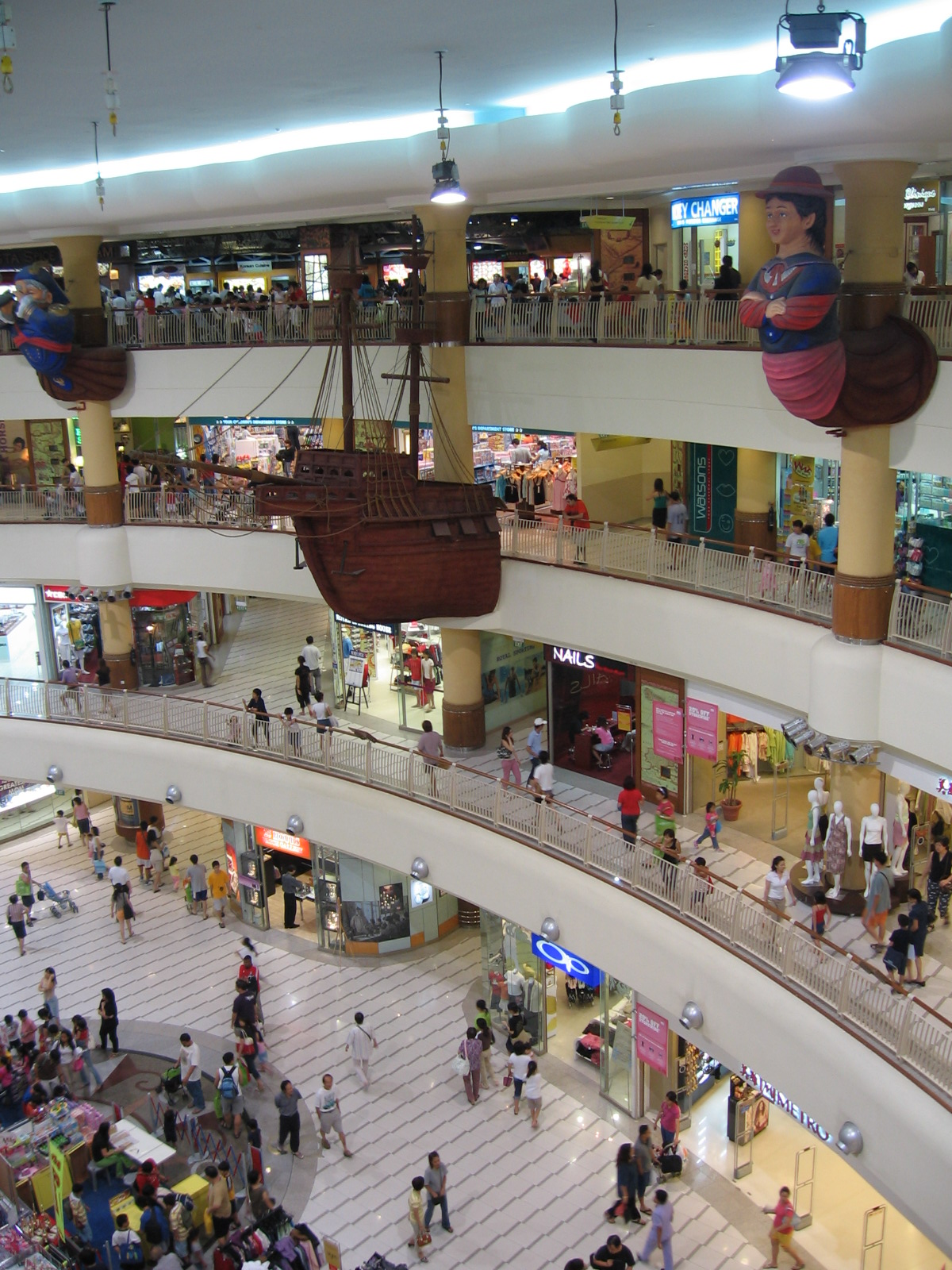
Wall mounts on the railings depicting the theme of the mall

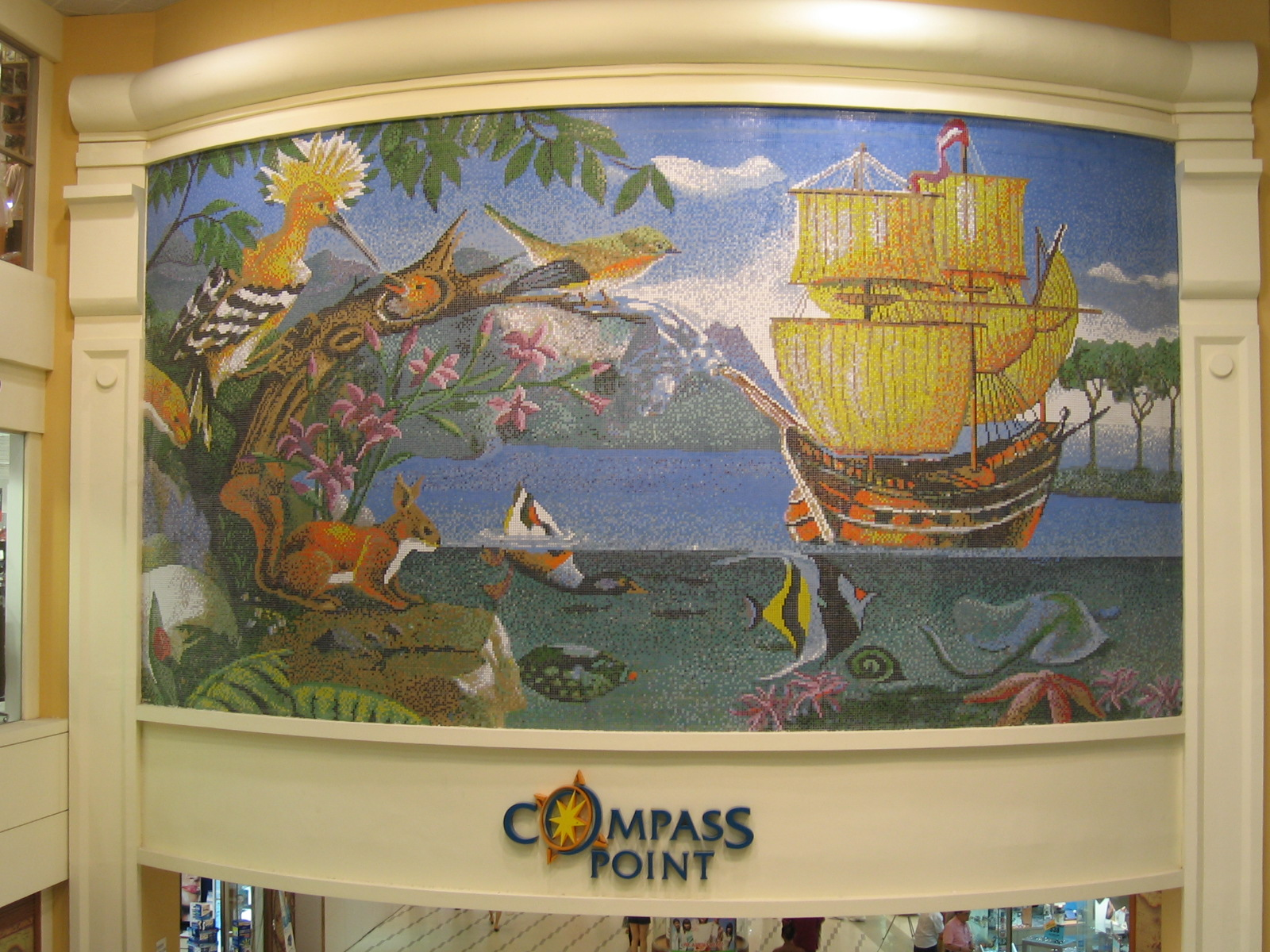
Wall tile mural in Compass Point

== See also ==
- Sengkang Community Hub
- Sengkang Bus Interchange
- Compassvale Bus Interchange
