= Punggol MRT/LRT station =

Mass Rapid Transit and light rail station in Singapore

Punggol NE17 CP4 PTC 榜鹅 பொங்கோல்
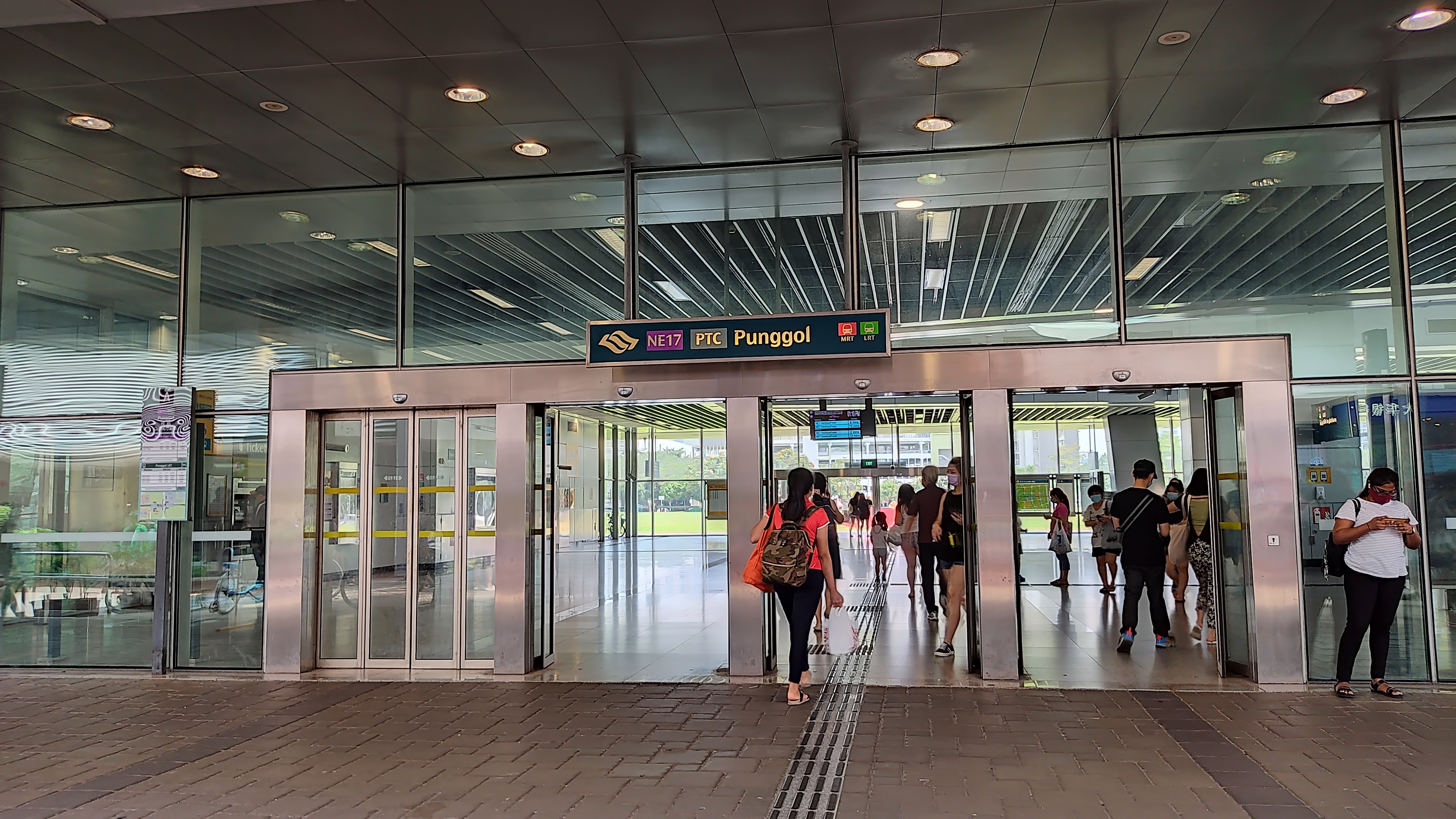
- Exit A of Punggol station

General information
- Location: 70 Punggol Central, Singapore 828868
- Coordinates: 01°24′19″N 103°54′09″E
- System: Mass Rapid Transit (MRT) / Light Rail Transit (LRT) interchange
- Owner: Land Transport Authority
- Operator: SBS Transit (North East Line, Punggol LRT)
- Line: North East Line Cross Island Line Punggol LRT
- Platforms: 4 (2 island platforms) + 2 (2 side platforms) (U/C)
- Tracks: 4 + 2 (U/C)
- Connections: Punggol, Taxi

Construction
- Structure type: Underground (North East Line and Cross Island Line); Elevated (Punggol LRT)
- Platform levels: 2 + 1 (U/C)
- Parking: Yes (Waterway Point)
- Cycle facilities: Yes
- Accessible: Yes

Other information
- Station code: PGL

History
- Opened: 20 June 2003; 23 years ago (North East Line); 29 January 2005; 21 years ago (LRT East Loop); 29 June 2014; 12 years ago (LRT West Loop)
- Opening: 2032; 6 years' time (Punggol extension)

Passengers
- June 2024: 38,929 per day

Services
Preceding station	Mass Rapid Transit	Following station
Sengkang towards HarbourFront	North East Line	Punggol Coast Terminus
Riviera towards Pasir Ris	Cross Island Line Punggol Extension Future service	Terminus
Preceding station	Light Rail Transit	Following station
Damai Clockwise / outer	Punggol LRT East Loop	Cove Anticlockwise / inner
Soo Teck Clockwise / outer	Punggol LRT West Loop	Sam Kee Anticlockwise / inner
Track layout
Location
- Location within Singapore Rail

Punggol MRT/LRT station is a Mass Rapid Transit (MRT) and Light Rail Transit (LRT) interchange station in Punggol, Singapore. It is an interchange station between the North East Line (NEL) and Punggol LRT (PGLRT), and one of the two MRT stations located within Punggol planning area. Stretching across Punggol Central, the station is situated next to Punggol Bus Interchange and the retail development of Waterway Point.

The station was completed on 20 June 2003 alongside the other NEL stations. It served as the northernmost terminus on the North East Line until it was superseded by Punggol Coast station on 10 December 2024. By 2032, the station will become the terminus of the future Cross Island Line (CRL) Punggol extension from Pasir Ris station, making it a triple-line interchange station. The station is the longest on the NEL at 320 metres (350 yards) long with aluminium and steel cladding, which gives the station a futuristic and modern look.

== History ==
=== North East Line (NEL) and LRT ===
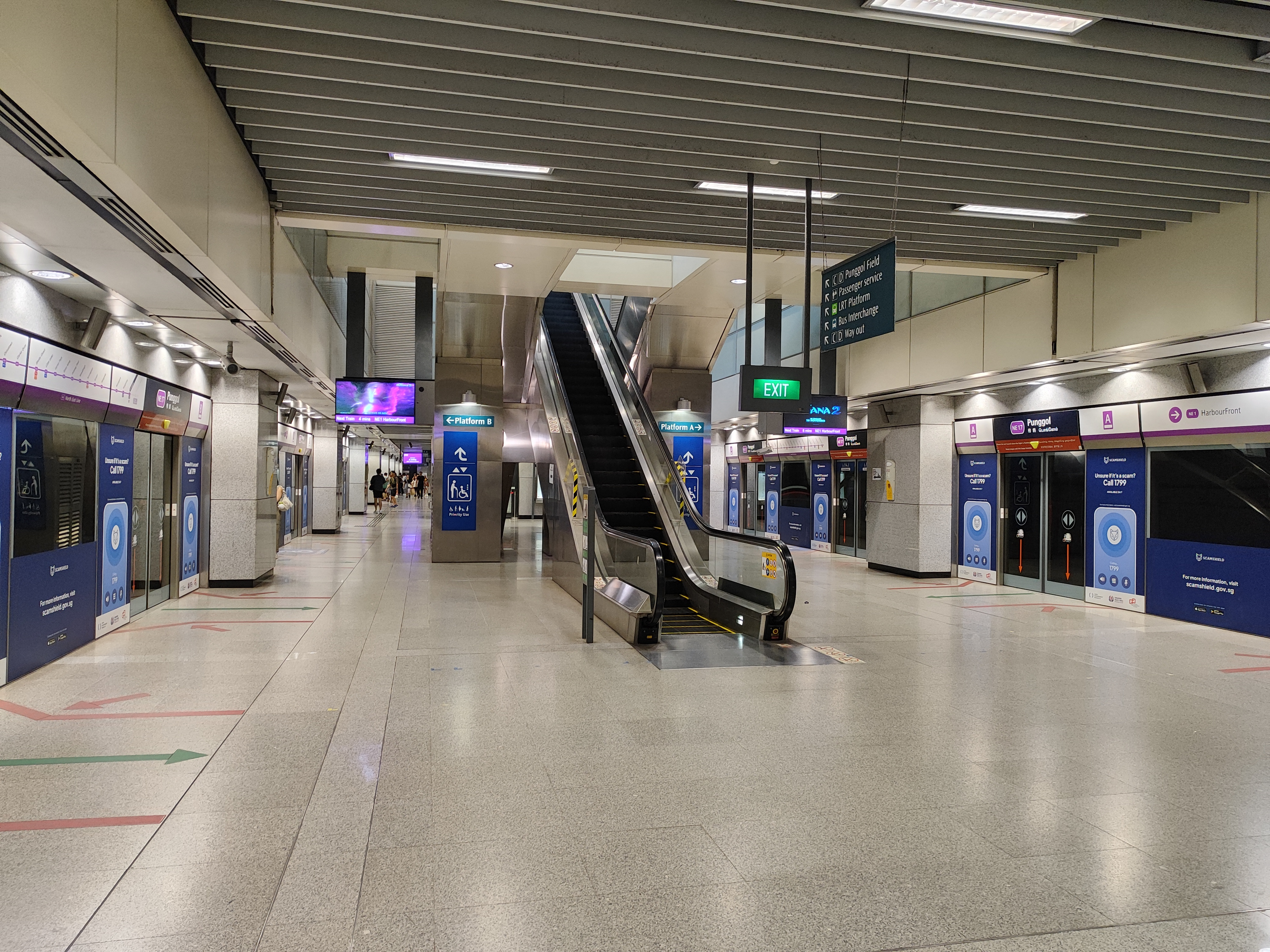
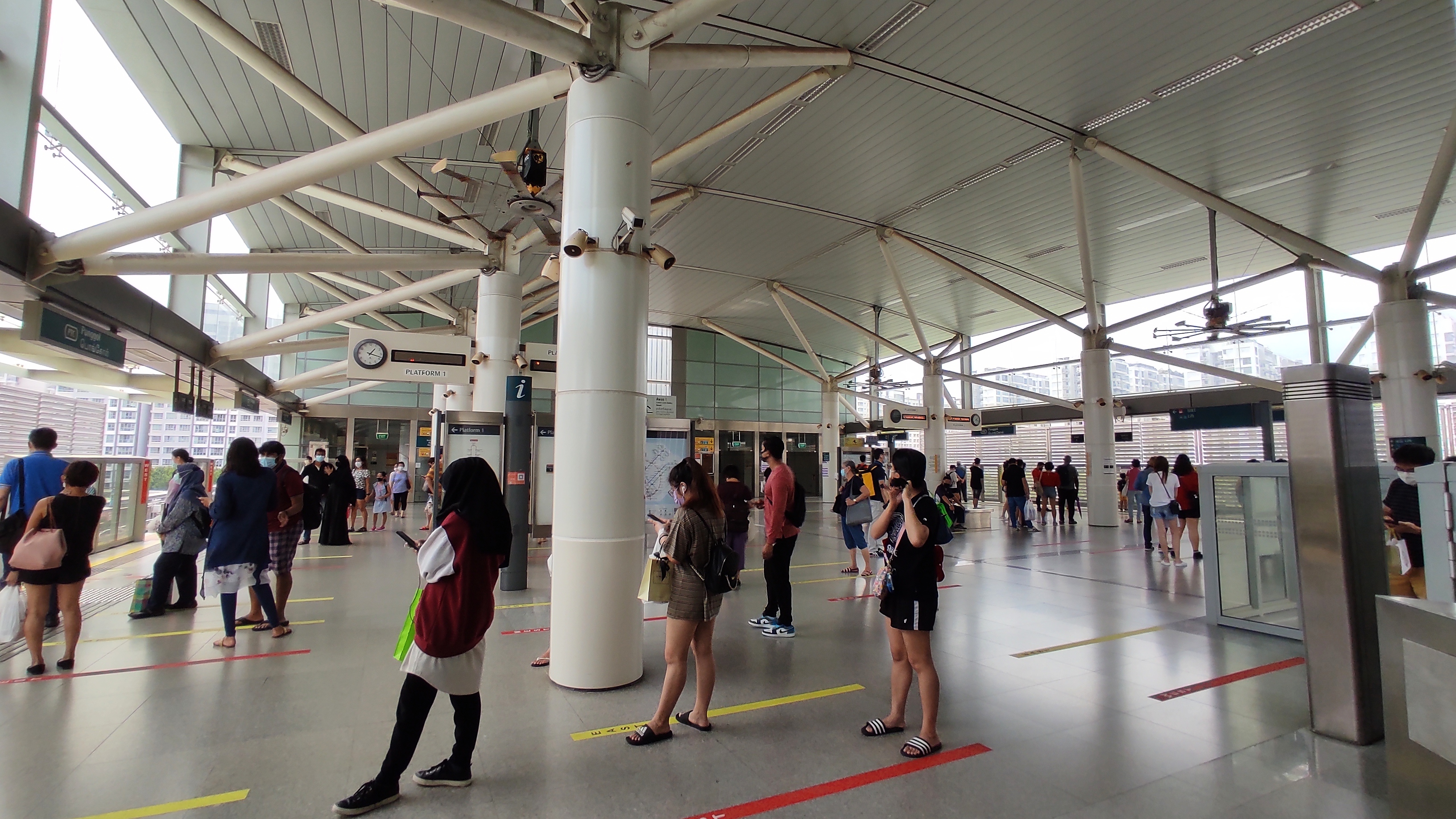
The NEL (top) and LRT platforms (bottom)

Starting from 1984, plans and studies were made for a possible MRT line serving north-eastern Singapore that operated between Outram Park and Punggol via Dhoby Ghaut. They were approved by the Mass Rapid Transit Corporation (MRTC) in October 1987 and submitted to the government. When the 16 NEL stations were revealed in March 1996, Punggol was confirmed to be the northern terminus of the line. However, it was not planned to be built until its surroundings had been developed extensively.

During the 1996 National Day Rally Speech, then-prime minister Goh Chok Tong announced that the station will serve the upcoming Punggol 21 development. The Punggol 21 development was also planned to have a light rail system. The contract for the construction of Punggol NEL station and 1.3 kilometres (0.81 miles) of tunnels was awarded to a joint venture between Sato-Kogyo and Hock Lian Seng for S$85.86 million (US$51.3 million) in March 1998.

In July 1998, it was further confirmed that the station would be linked to the upcoming LRT system serving the area. The contract for the design and construction of the 13-kilometre (8.1-mile) Punggol LRT system (PGLRT) was awarded to a joint venture – Singapore Technologies Industrial Corporation, Mitsubishi Heavy Industries and Mitsubishi Corporation – for S$656 million (US$391.97 million). (Note: The contract also includes the Sengkang LRT line)

Construction began in January 1999 and with the clearing of the farmway and forest land, to kick off the starting of Punggol New Town development. As the station was constructed in the middle of the forest, the station site was not easily accessible, and certain staff members at the Land Transport Authority (LTA) raised safety concerns, especially for women staff using the 800-metre (2,600 ft) track. The LTA addressed this by transporting people in and out of the site using buses. A few cobras, mostly killed and overrun by tractors, were encountered during the construction process. The Punggol station was completed in January 2003 and NEL operations began on 20 June 2003. On 29 January 2005, the station began to serve the east loop of the PGLRT. On 29 June 2014, the station began to serve the west loop.

=== Future plans and Cross Island Line (CRL) ===
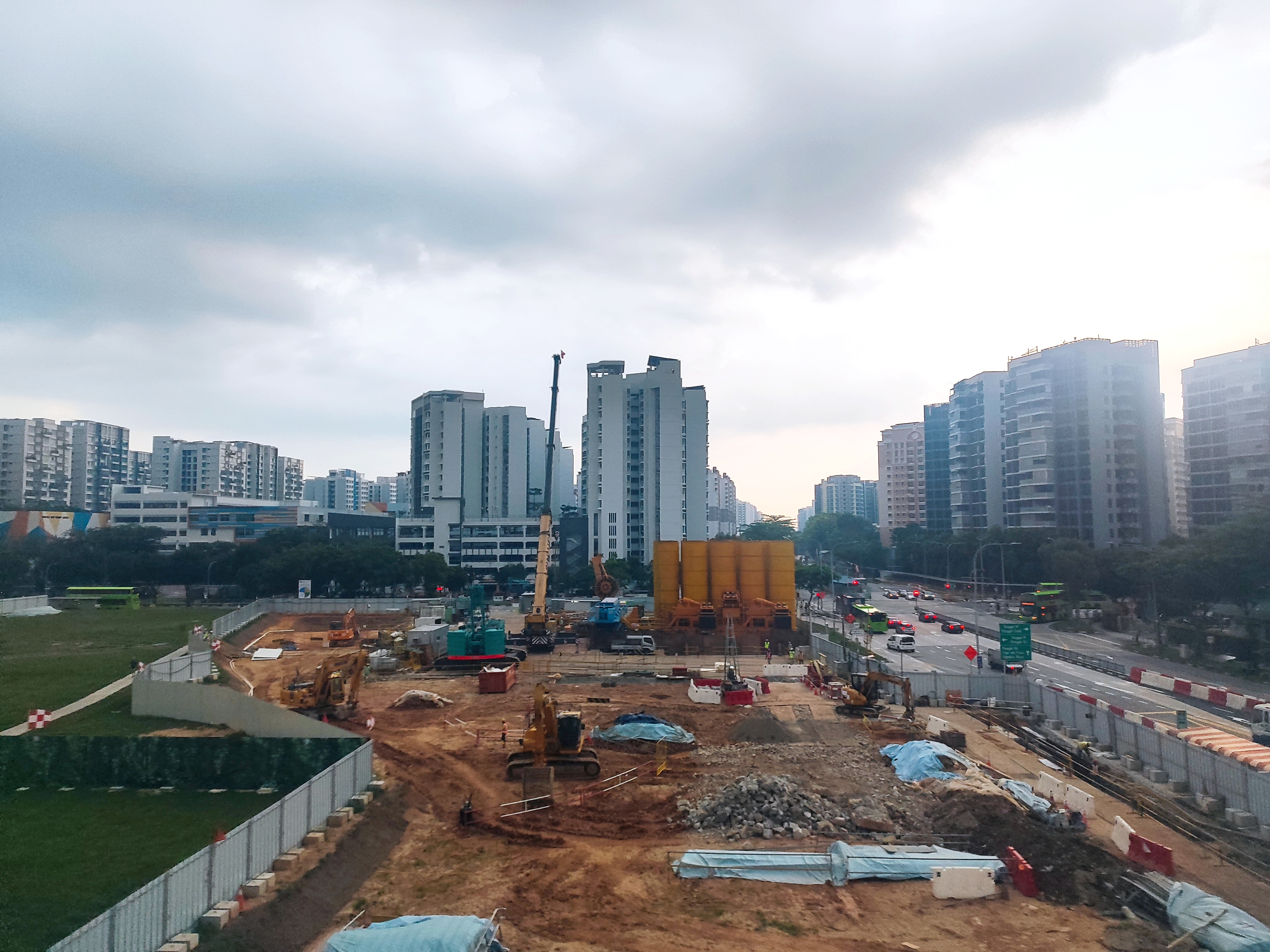
Punggol CRL construction site

During the construction of the NEL station, a 40-by-40-metre (130 by 130 ft) box was constructed beneath the NEL station to allow provisions for a possible future line. The station box was reserved for the North Shore Line, a proposed LRT line that would link between Pasir Ris and Woodlands or Sembawang. First announced by National Development Minister Lim Hng Kiang in December 1996, the line would have been built after the completion of developments in Simpang and Punggol.

The easternmost section of the North Shore Line was eventually revised as the Cross Island Line (CRL) Punggol extension. On 10 March 2020, the LTA announced that Punggol station will be the terminus of the proposed branch, which consists of four stations between this station and Pasir Ris station. The extension was originally scheduled to be completed in 2031. However, with restrictions imposed on construction works due to the COVID-19 pandemic, the expected completion date was pushed to 2032.

The contract for the design and construction of Punggol CRL Station and associated tunnels was awarded to Woh Hup (Private) Limited for S$496 million (US$363.6 million). Construction will start in 2023, with an expected completion in date of 2032. To facilitate CRL construction works, the underpass connecting the two halves of the NEL concourse was closed on 15 February 2024.

=== Incidents ===
On 27 February 2020, a power fault along the NEL resulted in service disruptions to the Punggol, Sengkang and Buangkok stations. At 5:36 am, a shuttle train service was provided which operated on a single platform between the Punggol and Buangkok stations. In order to facilitate the repair work, the power source to the tracks between the Hougang and Punggol stations was disconnected. Additionally, free regular and bridging bus services were provided to serve these stations. The repair works were completed by 11:49 am and normal service along the entire NEL was resumed at 12:14 pm. Further investigation revealed that a broken contact wire had affected the power source to trains moving off from Sengkang Depot, causing the service disruptions.

== Station details ==
=== Services ===
Punggol station is an interchange station on the Punggol LRT (PGLRT) and the North East Line (NEL), with an official station code of NE17/PTC. The station was the former terminus of the NEL with the next station being Sengkang. The station was extended one stop to Punggol Coast station in 2024. The station platforms operate from 5:05 am to 1:05 am daily.

On the PGLRT, the station is between the Cove and Damai stations on the East loop, and between the Sam Kee and Soo Teck stations on the West loop.

=== Design ===
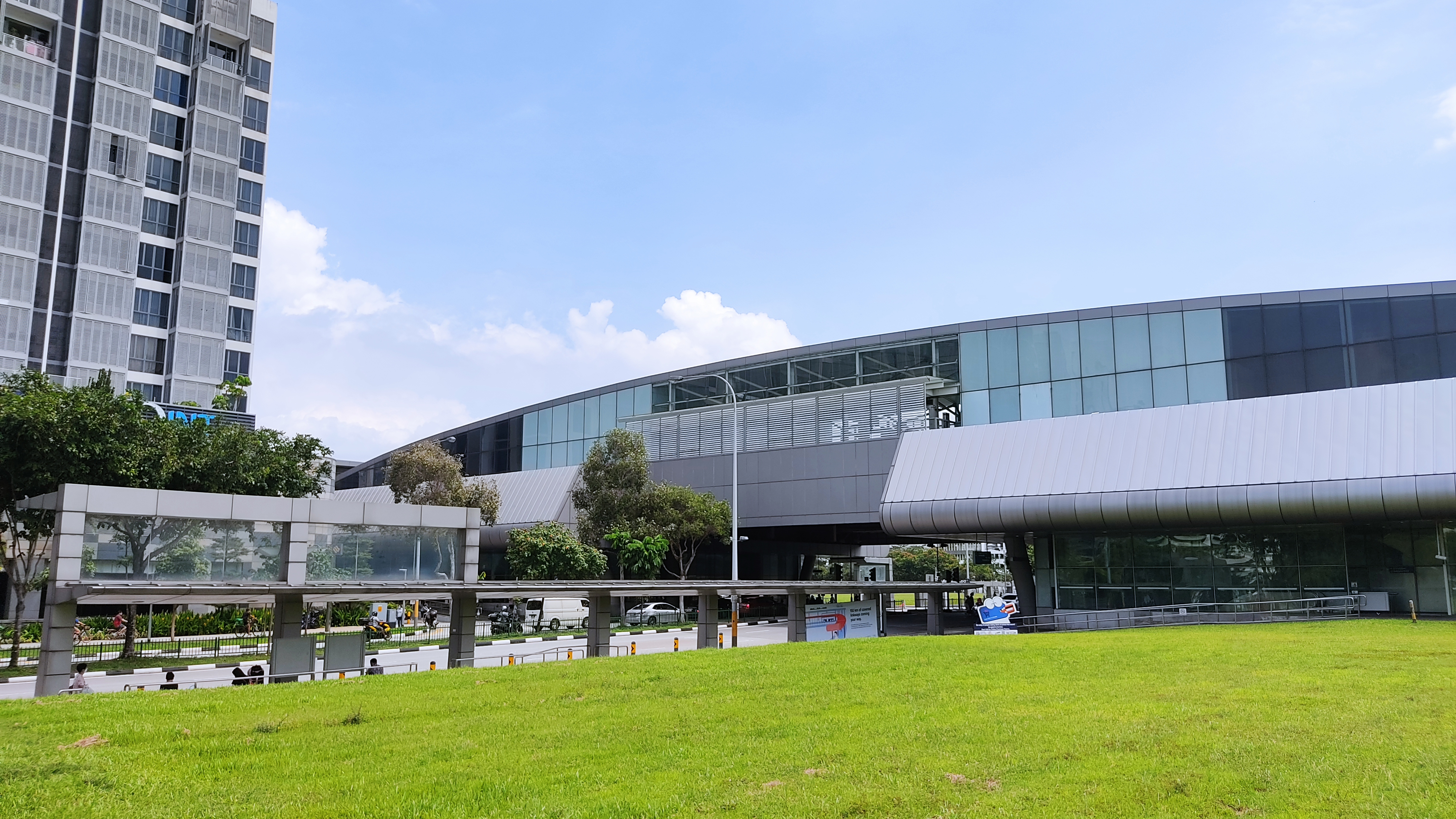
The station building spanning over Punggol Central

The station has three levels and four entrances. Designed by two architectural firms – 3HPArchitects and Farrells – the station is intended to be integrated with the LRT station and the bus interchange. The station's curved aluminium and stainless steel cladding gives it a futuristic outlook, best reflecting the developments of Punggol 21.

Punggol station is the longest station on the NEL, spanning over Punggol Central at 320 metres (350 yards); this was to accommodate the bus stops, taxi stands and passenger drop-off points along that road. Being above-ground, the station has higher air-conditioning demands, with more space required for the air-conditioning plant rooms. A major road, Punggol Central, runs through the middle of the station and bisects the concourse. An underpass used to link both sides of the road outside the paid area before its closure for CRL construction works. Due to its extensive structure which occupies an area of 21,920 m^{2} (26,220 sq yd), the station has six lifts, the most on the line.

=== Public artwork ===
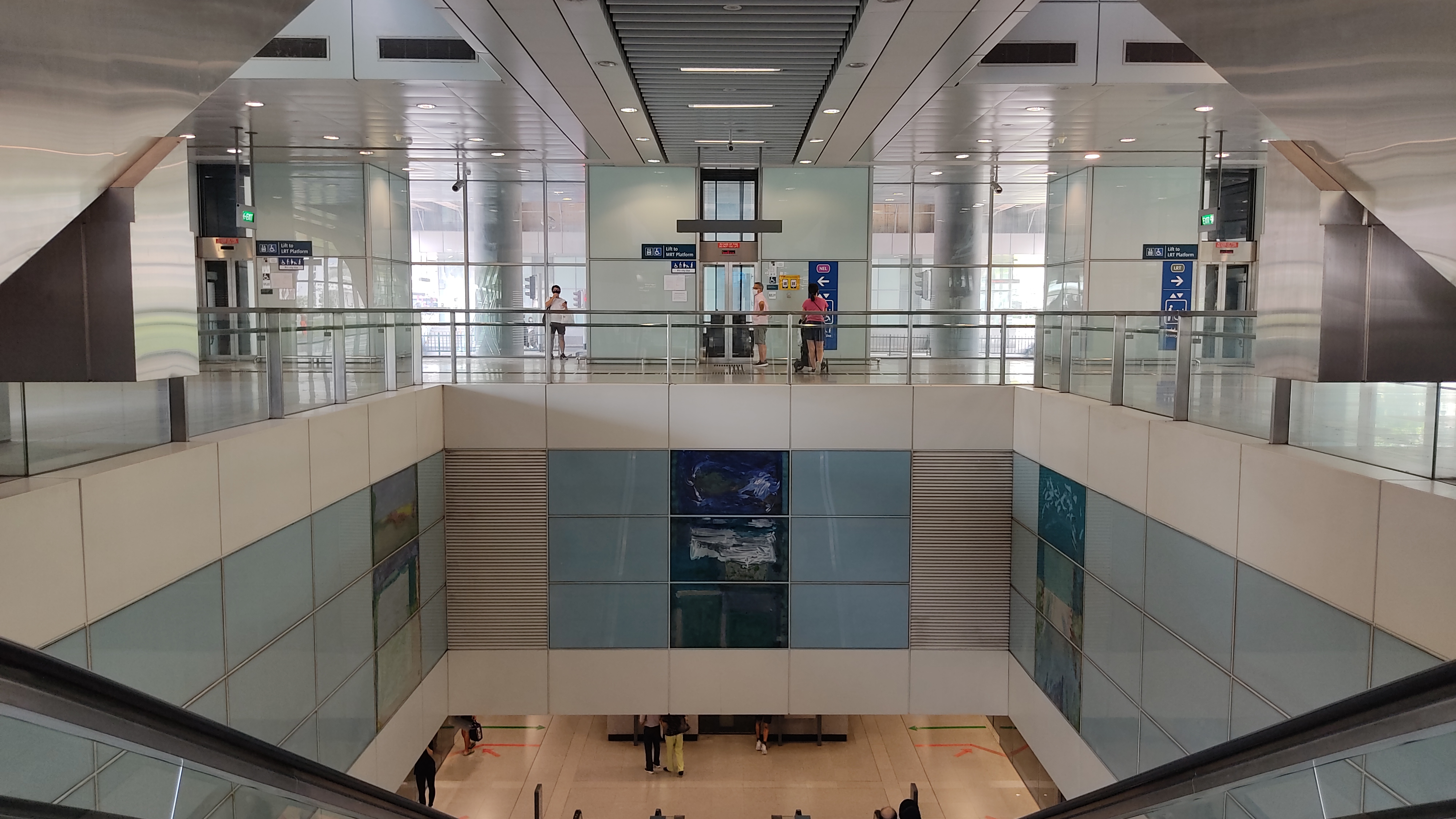
Three panels of Water, Landscape & Future by Goh Beng Kwan at the station's concourse level

Punggol station features an artwork Water, Landscape & Future by Goh Beng Kwan as part of the network's Art-in-Transit programme. (Note: Public art showcase which integrates artworks into the MRT network) The artwork consists of a set of nine glass paintings displayed around the concourse, with each 3-by-2-metre (9.8 by 6.6 ft) glass panel reflecting natural light in the station. The glass paintings represent elements of water, the seaside, kampongs and trees, with pieces of materials embedded in the glass to create a shimmering effect.

In the work, the artist uses various colours (blue/turquoise for the sea, yellow/brown/sienna for the kampungs and green for the trees) which reflects his memories of Punggol's past. While his inspiration is from the past, the artist used a contemporary style for this work, intending for his work to remain "fresh and appealing" to the residents of Punggol then, now and the future. First creating his work using oil and acrylic on canvas, Goh has the computer-generated copies put up in a 3D-model of the station. Presenting his work, the artist recounted that he had a difficult time convincing the Art Review Panel that the work could last a long time in a public place.

This was the first time Goh used glass as a medium. Creating the work required patience, as Goh had to repeatedly fire the glass after applying colour on the panel. As glass is fragile, a panel broke apart after being fired seven times. Recounting this as a "heartbreak", the artist went on to seek help from Howard Chua of Sun Glass. Chua then experimented with materials and colours to create the textures and colours closer to the originals. He used a unique method of integrating glass with glass and other materials. Hoping to recreate the textures of cloth and paper in the originals, new materials were introduced, while firing techniques were refined. The artist was fascinated by the "element of spontaneity" during the firing process, as the colours produced after the process vary greatly with different methods.

Seeing the artwork for himself, Goh realised that he could continue conveying himself through glass to accomplish his artistic vision. The artist "took pride" in the fact that he only needed natural lighting for his works, instead of special lighting. He hoped that his work would signal to commuters that they have arrived at Punggol. Additionally, for the elderly, he hoped the work will make them "think of the sea" and their youth.

== Notes and references ==
=== Bibliography ===
- Leong, Chan Teik (2003). Getting there : The story of the North East Line. Singapore: Land Transport Authority (LTA). ISBN 981-04-5886-X. OCLC 53383062.
- Tan, Su (2003). Art in transit : North East Line MRT - Singapore. Singapore: Land Transport Authority. ISBN 981-04-7384-2. OCLC 52771106.
