= Sengkang Bus Interchange =

Bus interchange in Sengkang New Town, Singapore

Sengkang Bus Interchange 盛港巴士转换站 Pusat Pertukaran Bas Sengkang
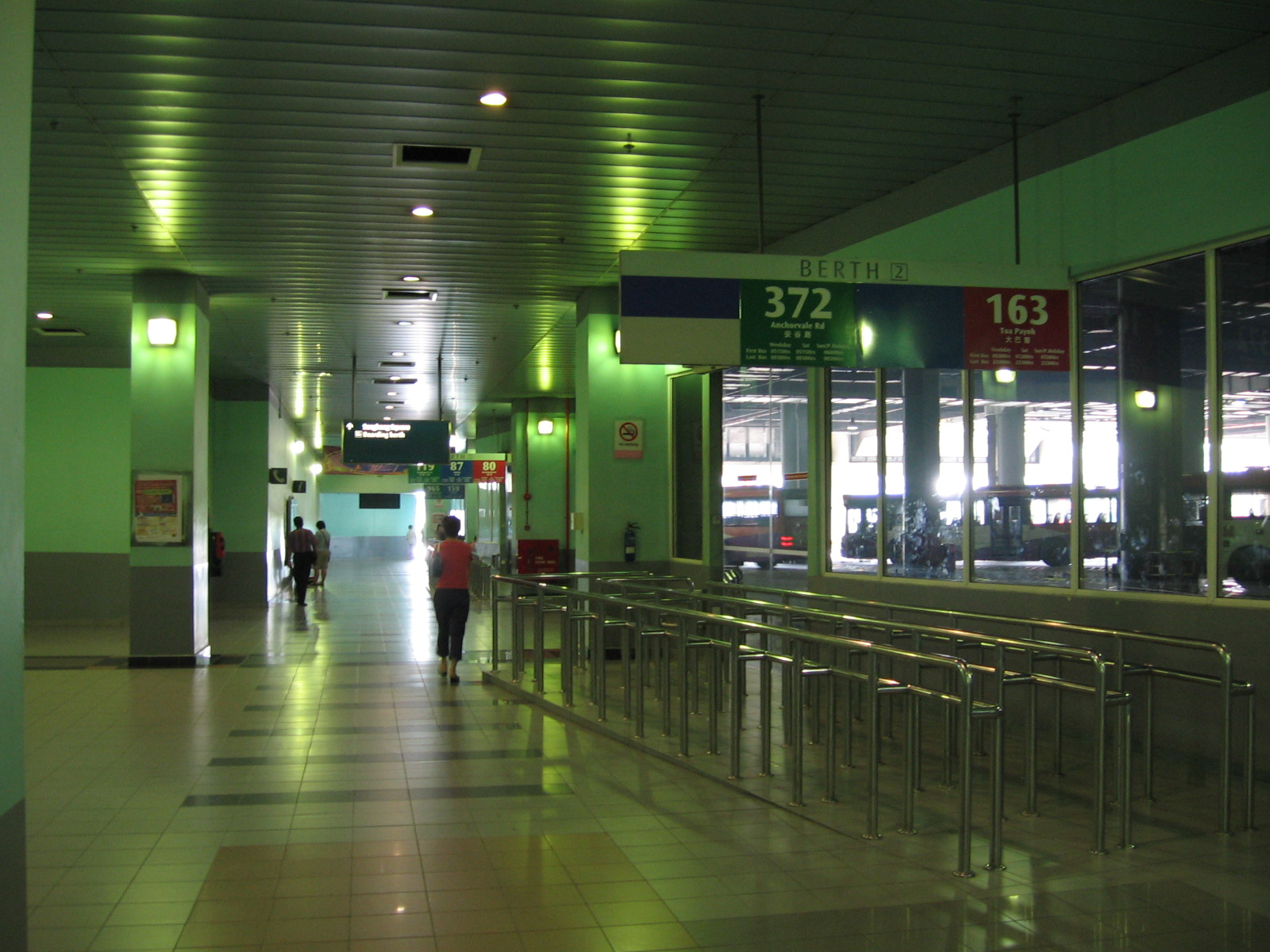
- Interior of the bus interchange.

General information
- Location: 13 Sengkang Square, Singapore 545077
- System: Public Bus Interchange
- Owner: Land Transport Authority
- Operator: SBS Transit
- Bus routes: 8 (SBS Transit); 1 (Go-Ahead Singapore)
- Bus stands: 2 Linear Alighting Berths; 4 Sawtooth Boarding Berths
- Bus operators: SBS Transit; Go-Ahead Singapore
- Connections: NE16 STC Sengkang

Construction
- Structure type: At-grade
- Accessible: Accessible alighting/boarding points Accessible public toilets Graduated kerb edges Tactile guidance system

History
- Opened: 28 April 2001; 25 years ago (Temporary); 18 January 2003; 23 years ago (Integrated Transport Hub)
- Closed: 17 January 2003; 23 years ago (Temporary)

Key dates
- 28 April 2001: Commenced operations
- 18 January 2003: Operations transferred to new and air-conditioned bus interchange as Integrated Transport Hub
Location

Sengkang Bus Interchange is an air-conditioned bus interchange located at Sengkang Town Centre, serving residential areas around Sengkang. It is the second air-conditioned bus interchange in Singapore, integrated within the Sengkang MRT/LRT station building, Compass One shopping mall and Compass Heights condominium. Nearby public amenities include the Sengkang Community Hub and Kopitiam Square.

== History ==
=== Enhancement ===
To improve ventilation at the former non-air conditioned alighting bays, the Land Transport Authority constructed a new air-conditioned passageway connecting to the existing air conditioned boarding areas in 2007. On 24 November 2014, LTA officially announced the expansion of the interchange to accommodate future bus services under the Bus Service Enhancement Programme (BSEP) Scheme as the current interchange does not have enough parking spaces for more services. The expansion consists of 12 additional parking bays, boarding and alighting facilities, concourse area, staff lounge and a canteen. The expansion works were scheduled to be completed in the third quarter of 2016. The extension, named Compassvale Bus Interchange (formerly referred to as Sengkang Bus Interchange Expansion), is located opposite the current bus interchange along Sengkang Square and it officially opened on 12 March 2017 together with the launch of bus service 374. In August 2024, the Land Transport Authority announced an upgrade for Sengkang Bus Interchange as part of a seven bus interchanges modernization project, leading to the temporary relocation of some bus services to Compassvale Bus Interchange in 2026 to facilitate upgrading works.

== Bus contracting model ==
Under the bus contracting model, all bus services operating from Sengkang Bus Interchange were divided into two bus packages, operated by two bus operators.

=== List of bus services ===
Operator	Package	Service	Berth	Destination	Remarks
Go-Ahead Singapore	Loyang	83	B4	Punggol	Looping Point (Note: Due to limited parking space, bus service 83 loops around the interchange instead of terminating there.)
SBS Transit	Sengkang–Hougang	80	B3	HarbourFront	—N/a
SBS Transit	Sengkang–Hougang	80A	B3	Aljunied Road (Aljunied Station)	Short Trip Service
SBS Transit	Sengkang–Hougang	86	B4	Ang Mo Kio	—N/a
SBS Transit	Sengkang–Hougang	87	B3	Bedok	—N/a
SBS Transit	Sengkang–Hougang	159	B2	Toa Payoh	—N/a
SBS Transit	Sengkang–Hougang	159A	B2	Ang Mo Kio Avenue 8 (Ang Mo Kio Station)	Short Trip Service
SBS Transit	Sengkang–Hougang	163	B2	Toa Payoh	—N/a
SBS Transit	Sengkang–Hougang	163A	B2	Fernvale Lane (Bef Sengkang West Rd)	Short Trip Service
SBS Transit	Sengkang–Hougang	163B	B2	Yio Chu Kang Road (Aft Lentor Station Exit 4)	Short Trip Service
SBS Transit	Sengkang–Hougang	371	B1	↺ Rivervale Crescent	—N/a
SBS Transit	Sengkang–Hougang	372	B1	↺ Punggol Road	—N/a
SBS Transit	Sengkang–Hougang	374	B2	↺ Fernvale Road	—N/a
