= Sengkang MRT/LRT station =

Mass Rapid Transit and light rail station in Singapore

Sengkang NE16 STC 盛港 செங்காங்
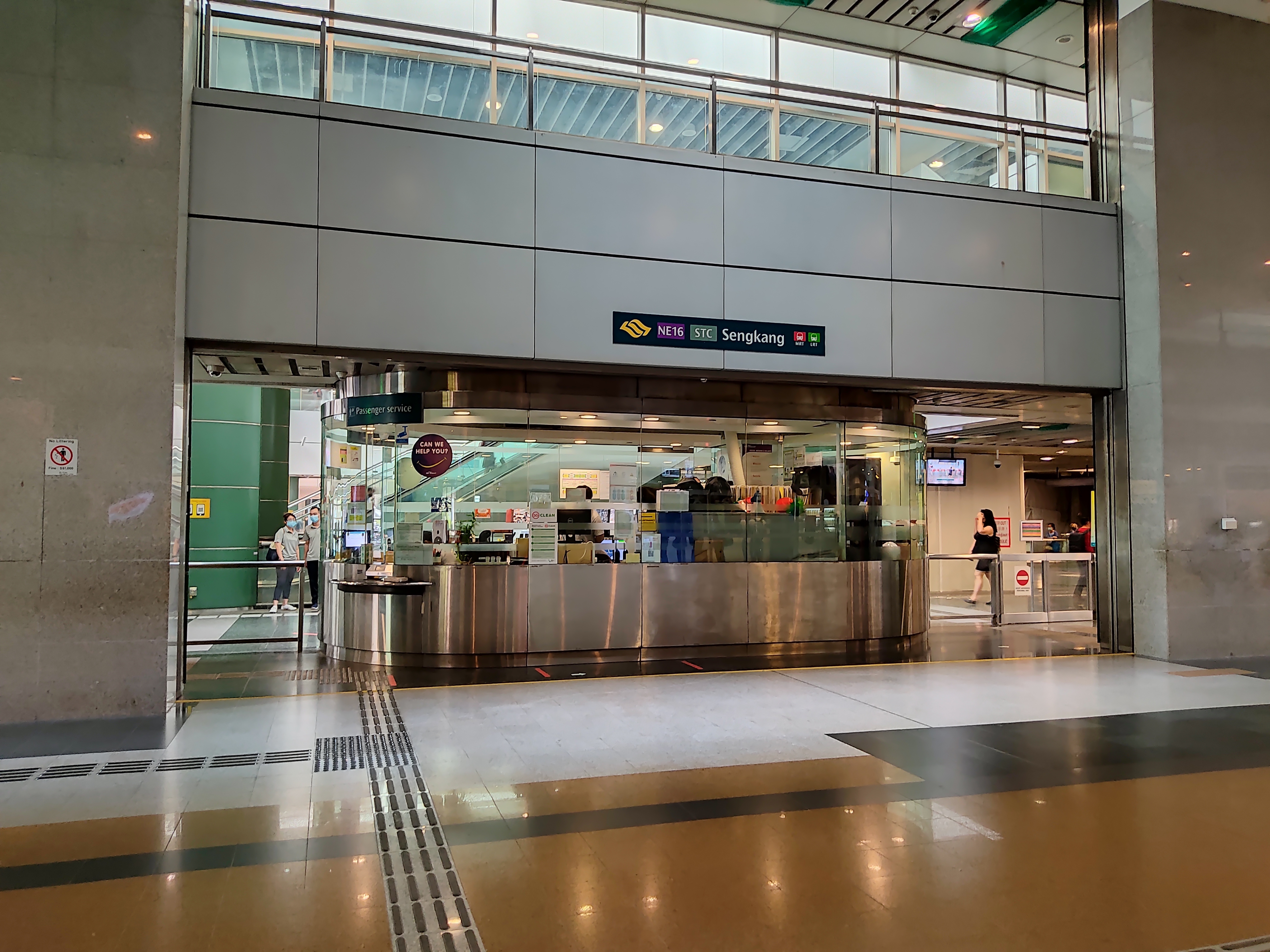
- The passenger service centre at the concourse of the station

General information
- Location: 5 Sengkang Square, Singapore 545062
- Coordinates: 01°23′30″N 103°53′44″E
- System: Mass Rapid Transit (MRT) / Light Rail Transit (LRT) interchange
- Owner: Land Transport Authority
- Operator: SBS Transit (North East Line, Sengkang LRT)
- Line: North East Line Sengkang LRT
- Platforms: 4 (2 island platforms)
- Tracks: 4 (2 MRT, 2 LRT)
- Connections: Sengkang, Taxi

Construction
- Structure type: Underground (North East Line); Elevated (Sengkang LRT)
- Platform levels: 2
- Parking: Yes (Compass One)
- Cycle facilities: Yes
- Accessible: Yes

Other information
- Station code: SKG

History
- Opened: 18 January 2003; 23 years ago (LRT East Loop); 20 June 2003; 23 years ago (North East Line); 29 January 2005; 21 years ago (LRT West Loop)

Passengers
- June 2024: 39,617 per day

Services
Preceding station	Mass Rapid Transit	Following station
Buangkok towards HarbourFront	North East Line	Punggol towards Punggol Coast
Preceding station	Light Rail Transit	Following station
Compassvale Clockwise / outer	Sengkang LRT East Loop	Ranggung Anticlockwise / inner
Renjong Clockwise / outer	Sengkang LRT West Loop	Cheng Lim Anticlockwise / inner
Track layout
Location
- Location within Singapore Rail

Sengkang MRT/LRT station is a Mass Rapid Transit (MRT) and Light Rail Transit (LRT) interchange station in Sengkang, Singapore. It is an interchange between the North East Line (NEL) and Sengkang LRT (SKLRT). Along with Buangkok station, it is located within the Sengkang planning area.

The LRT station opened on 18 January 2003 along with the other East loop stations on the SKLRT, (Note: The other LRT stations are Compassvale, Rumbia, Bakau, Kangkar and Ranggung) with the NEL station opening later on 20 June. Services on the West loop began service on 29 January 2005. Upgrades to the station are being implemented to improve barrier-free accessibility to the station. Located at Sengkang Town Centre between Sengkang Square and Sengkang East Way, it is directly connected to Compass One, Compass Heights and Sengkang Bus Interchange, and is within walking distance to the Compassvale Bus Interchange.

== History ==
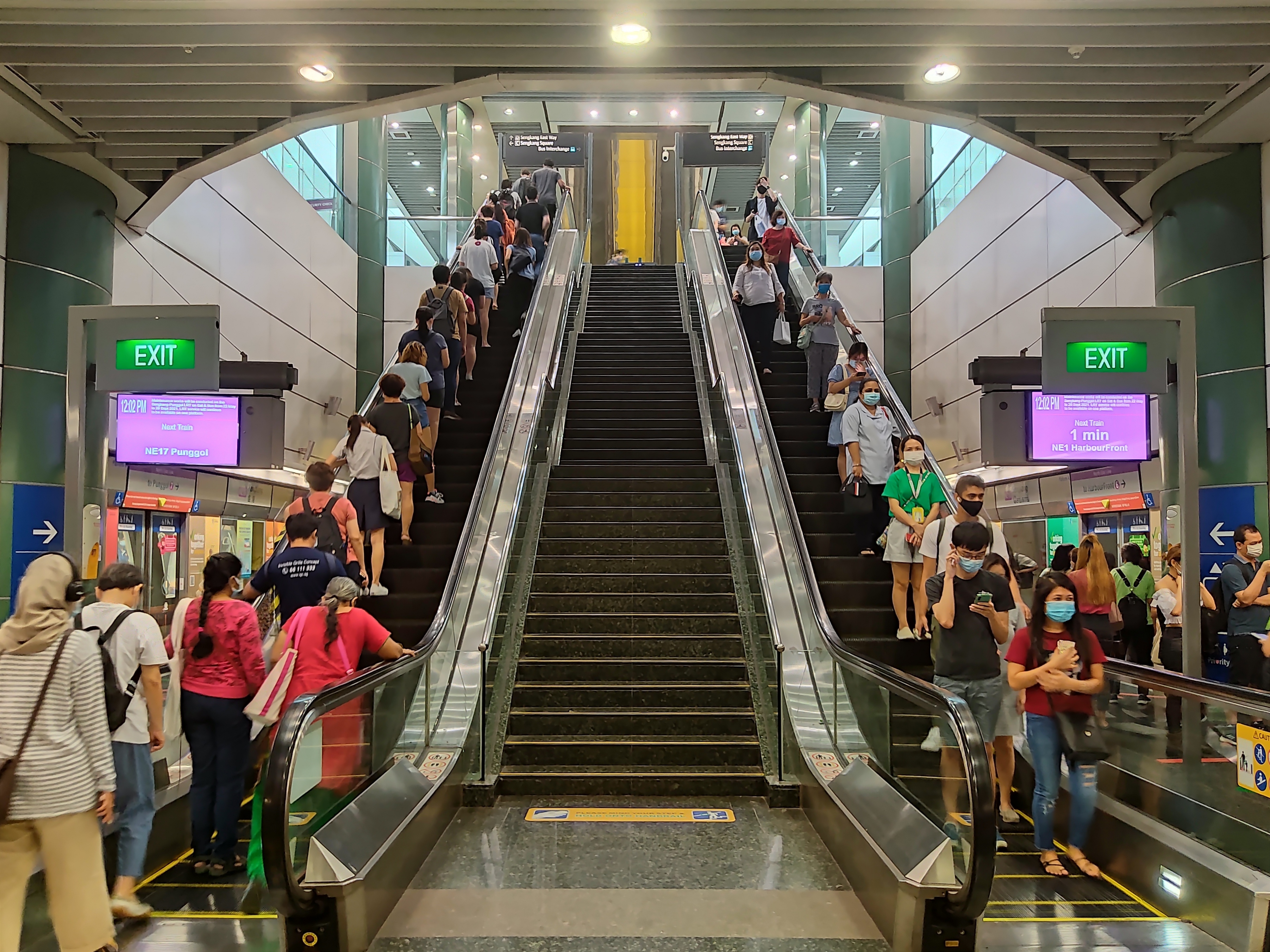
Sengkang MRT platforms

The station was built to serve the Sengkang New Town developed under a government programme to transform the Sengkang area into a fully mature housing estate. Contract 702 for the construction of Sengkang and Buangkok stations was awarded to Sato Kogyo-Hock Lian Seng Engineering Joint Venture on 26 April 1997. The S$166.4 million (US$112.1 million) contract included the construction of 1.6-kilometre (0.99 mi) connecting tunnels between the stations and 1.2-kilometre (0.75 mi) tunnels to Sengkang Depot

The elevated LRT station opened on 18 January 2003 when the East loop of the Sengkang LRT (SKLRT) started operations. The underground North East Line platforms opened on 20 June that year. The station began to serve the West loop of the SKLRT when certain stations on the loop (Note: These stations are the Thanggam, Fernvale, Layar, Tongkang and Renjong LRT stations) opened on 29 January 2005.

As part of efforts to improve the overall accessibility of public transport, the overhead pedestrian bridge near Sengkang and other stations (Note: The other stations are Aljunied, Bishan, Khatib, Kranji and Yew Tee) have lifts installed from 2013 onwards to improve barrier-free accessibility to major transport nodes. A pair of lifts were installed at the Exit B overhead bridge of the station, one at each side of Sengkang East Way. An additional lift was subsequently installed at the other end of the Exit C overhead bridge of the station in 2021. Sengkang station was also the first batch of ten stations to have additional bicycle parking facilities (Note: The other stations are: Admiralty, Aljunied, Boon Lay, Chinese Garden, Khatib, Lakeside, Sembawang, Simei and Yishun) under the National Cycling Plan announced in 2010.

In May 2018, the LTA announced plans to refurbish the Sengkang LRT platform. The upgrades included expanding the LRT platform and installing new dual-speed escalators and a new lift to connect the platforms, concourse and mezzanine levels of the station. The works were expected to be completed by 2022. New signs and queue markings were implemented to indicate new stopping locations for each of the four LRT routes plying the station. The new platforms began operations at the end of September 2024.

=== Incidents ===
On 27 February 2020, a power fault along the NEL resulted in service disruptions to the Punggol, Sengkang and Buangkok stations. At 5:36 am, a shuttle train service was provided which operated on a single platform between the Punggol and Buangkok stations. In order to facilitate maintenance works, the power source to the tracks between the Hougang and Punggol stations was switched off. Additionally, shuttle bus services to serve the affected stations were provided. The fault was resolved by 11:49 am and usual service along the entire NEL resumed at 12:14 pm. Investigations later revealed that a broken contact wire affected the power source to trains launching from Sengkang Depot, causing the service disruptions.

== Station details ==
=== Location and name ===
The station is in Sengkang New Town along Sengkang Square. The station serves the developments of Compass Heights, Compass One and the Sengkang Bus Interchange, and is within walking distance of the Compassvale Bus Interchange, the Kopitiam Square and the Sengkang Community Hub. The station name, Sengkang, means "prosperous harbour" in Mandarin.

=== Services ===
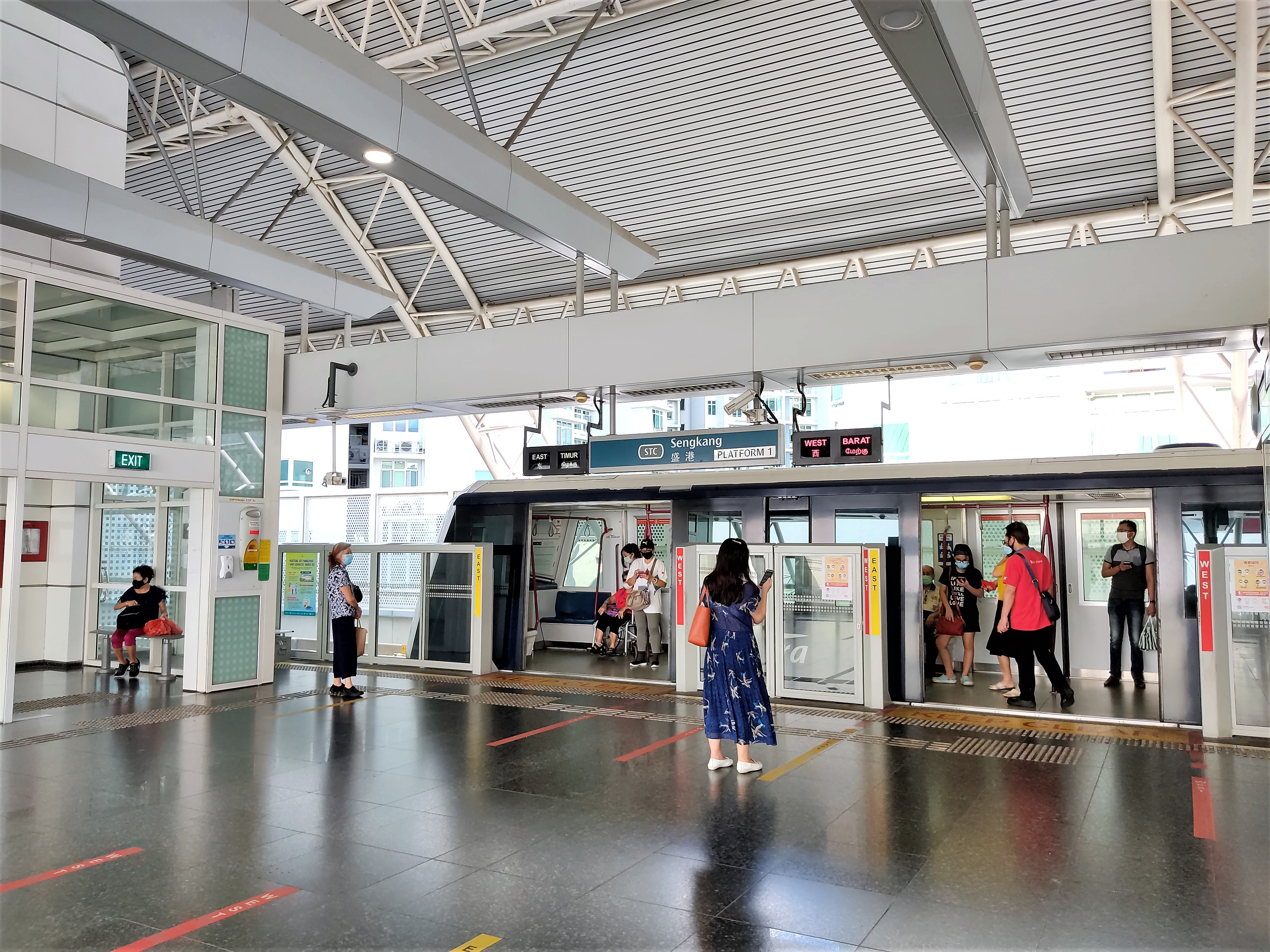
A West Loop-bound LRT train stopping at Sengkang

The station serves both the Sengkang LRT line (SKLRT) and the North East Line (NEL). The official station code is NE16/STC. On the SKLRT, the station is the terminus for both East loop and West loop services in both directions. The adjacent stations on the LRT line are Compassvale and Ranggung stations on the East loop and Cheng Lim and Renjong stations on the West loop. Train frequencies range from 3 to 10 minutes depending on the time of the day. The station is open from 5:05 am to 1:00 am. On the NEL, the station is between the Buangkok and Punggol stations.

=== Design ===
The station has four levels (two platform levels, mezzanine and concourse ground level). It is an integrated hub with the three modes of transport — MRT, LRT and bus — serving the Sengkang area. The MRT/LRT station was the first intermodal station on the MRT network for all three modes of transport. The simple layout, the atrium-like open layout and glass enclosure in the station design allow visual connections through levels and spaces, making navigation in and out of the station easier. Besides integrating with transport facilities, the station is fully integrated with the property developments of Compass Heights and Compass Point (now Compass One).

=== Public artwork ===
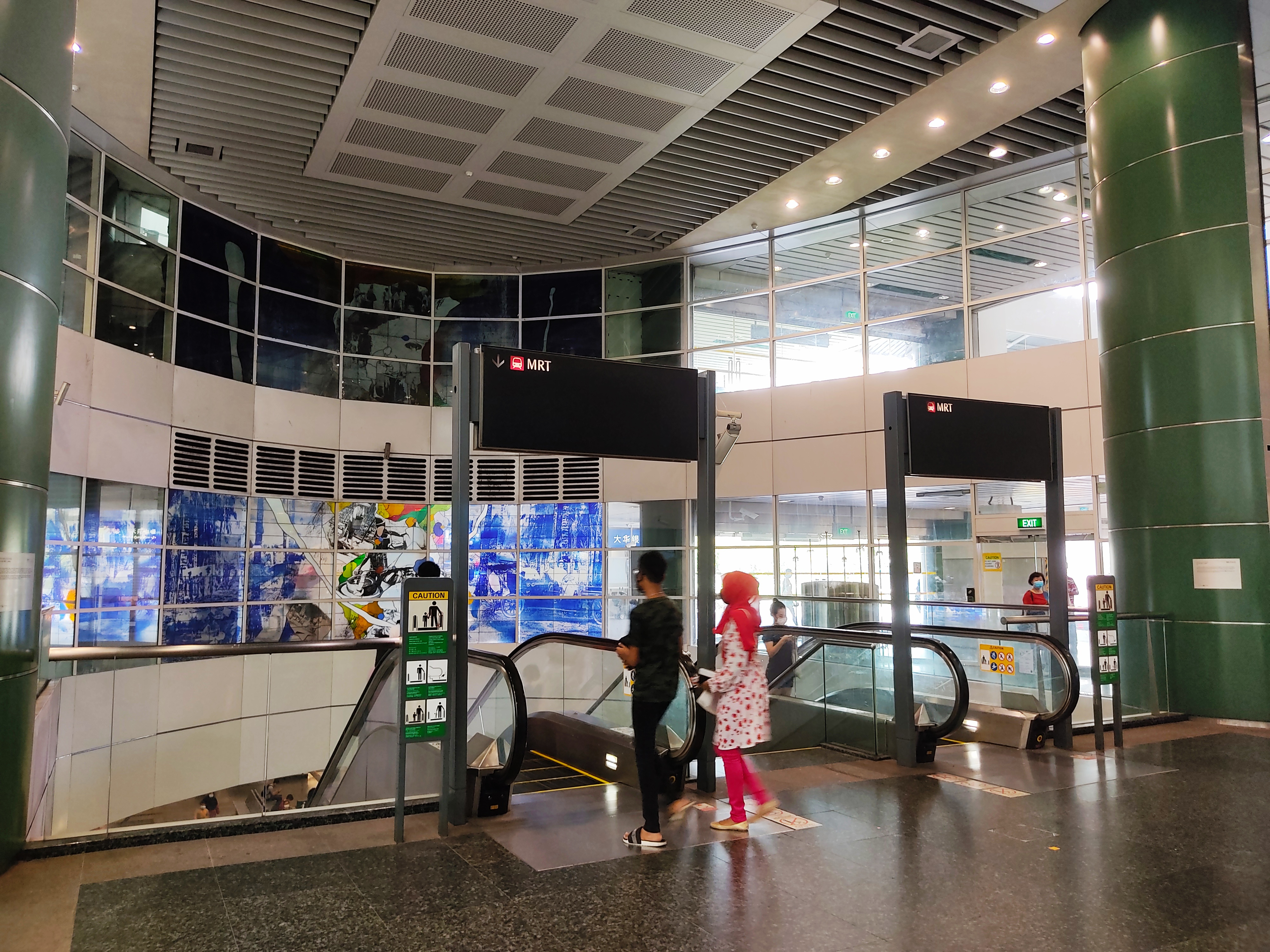
T.R.A.N.S.I.T.I.O.N.S. by Koh Bee Liang at the mezzanine level of the station

As part of the MRT system's Art-in-Transit Programme, (Note: Public art showcase which integrates artworks into the MRT network) T.R.A.N.S.I.T.I.O.N.S. by Koh Bee Liang, an artwork consisting of two contrasting stained-glass murals, is displayed above ground at the opposite ends of the station mezzanine level. The station is filled with colourful rays as light is filtered through the stained glass windows. The glass murals mark Sengkang's transition from a rural kampung (depicted in "warm nostalgic images of the past") to high-raised buildings (in black and white) that are now part of the landscape. As time goes by, the work also changes throughout the day with the transition of the sun.

The black and white mural of New Sengkang, according to the artist, reflects how "we built up to reach the heavens", without pausing to reflect on the purpose. This is a reference to Singapore's urban renewal, which involves parting of the old and the memories associated with it. The distortions of the new HDB (Housing Development Board) skyscrapers also relate to the fragility of life as a result of the September 11 attacks. In contrast, the Old Sengkang mural, made of opalescent glass, depicts various characters of Singapore's past. The artist, when creating the mural to reflect the past, had conducted various interviews of old residents and used research at the Singapore National Archives for the artwork, in addition to using her experience growing up in a Kampung similar to old Sengkang.
