= List of defunct airlines of Asia =

This is a list of defunct airlines in Asia.

== Bahrain ==
Defunct airlines of Bahrain include:

Airline	Image	IATA	ICAO	Callsign	Commenced operations	Ceased operations	Notes
Bahrain Air		BN	BNB	BAHRAIN AIR	2008	2013	
Gulf Aviation					1950	1973	to Gulf Air on 1 January 1974
Gulf Traveller		GF	GFA	GULF AIR	2003	2007	
Swiftair Bahrain			SFL		2008	2012	

== Brunei ==
Defunct airlines of Brunei include:

Airline	Image	IATA	ICAO	Callsign	Commenced operations	Ceased operations	Notes
Borneo Airways		BI	RBA	BRUNEI	1997	1999	Formed by Royal Brunei Airlines
RB Link		BI	RBA	BRUNEI	2019	2020	Formed by Royal Brunei Airlines
Transcorp					1985	1985	

== China ==
=== Macau ===
Defunct airlines of Macau include:

Airline	Image	IATA	ICAO	Callsign	Commenced operations	Ceased operations	Notes
Macau Asia Express					2006	2008	Failed project
Metis TransPacific Airlines					2006	2007	Not launched
Sky Shuttle					1997	2008	
Viva Macau		ZG	VVM	JACKPOT	2005	2010	

=== Manchukuo ===
Defunct airlines of Manchukuo include:

Airline	Image	IATA	ICAO	Callsign	Commenced operations	Ceased operations	Notes
Manchuria Aviation Company	RH				1931	1945	

== Korea, North ==
Defunct airlines of North Korea include:

Airline	Image	IATA	ICAO	Callsign	Commenced operations	Ceased operations	Notes
Civil Aviation Administration of Korea (CAAK)		KB;JS	KCA		1955	1992	Rebranded as Air Koryo
SOKAO		KB;JS	KCA	UKAMPS	1950	1954	Rebranded as CAAK

== Kuwait ==
Defunct airlines of Kuwait include:

Airline	Image	IATA	ICAO	Callsign	Commenced operations	Ceased operations	Notes
Kuwait National Airways					1953	1957	Renamed/merged to Kuwait Airways
Trans Arabia Airways				TAAK	1955	1964	
Wataniya Airways		Q9	WAN	WATANIYA	2005	2018	

== Mongolia ==
Defunct airlines of Mongolia include:

Airline	Image	IATA	ICAO	Callsign	Commenced operations	Ceased operations	Notes
Chinggis Airways		CW	CHS		2011	2012	Formed by BAZ International, Mongolia. Expected to start in March 2012.
Eastern Airlines			ERN		1997	2000	
Hangard Airlines		OM	HGD	HANGARD	1993	2001	
Mongolian Airlines Group		MR	MML		2011	2013	Rebranded as Hunnu Air. Formed by Bodi Group. Started services on 2 December 2011. Renamed in April 2013 to Hunnu Air to avoid confusion with MIAT Mongolian Airlines.
Khangarid					2004	2005	
Air Cargo Mongolia			MGC	MONGOLIA CARGO	2013	2013	

== Palestine ==
Airline	Image	IATA	ICAO	Callsign	Commenced operations	Ceased operations	Notes
Palestinian Airlines		PF	PNW	PALESTINIAN	1995	2020	

== Syria ==
Defunct airlines of Syria include:

Airline	Image	IATA	ICAO	Callsign	Commenced operations	Ceased operations	Notes
Damascene Airways			DAS;TYL		2006	2007	
FlyDamas		4J	FDK		2014	2018	Formed in 11/14. AOC granted on 19/2/15. Started services on 3/12/15. Ceased operations in 1/18.
Orient Air			OVV	-	2006	2007	
Sham Wings Airlines		6Q	SAW		2007	2009	Renamed/merged to Cham Wings Airlines
Cham Wings Airlines		6Q	SAW	SHAMWING	2009	2025	Re-established as Fly Cham
Syrian Airways					1946	1958	Merged with Misrair to form United Arab Airlines. Syria's association with UAA ended in October 1961, when Syrian Arab Airways was established by the Syrian government in Damascus
Syrian Arab Air Lines		RB		-	1961	1977	Renamed/merged to Syrian Air
Syrian Pearl Airlines		PI	PSB		2009	2010	

== Timor-Leste ==
Defunct airlines of Timor-Leste include:

Airline	Image	IATA	ICAO	Callsign	Commenced operations	Ceased operations	Notes
Air Timor		6C			2007	2023	
Timor Air		BF	ETA		2011	2012	
Transportes Aéreos de Timor					1939	1975	Operated in the former Portuguese Timor

== Uzbekistan ==
Defunct airlines of Uzbekistan include:

Airline	Image	IATA	ICAO	Callsign	Commenced operations	Ceased operations	Notes
Asia Union Airlines		7Q	AUV	ASIA UNION	2022	2025	rebranded to FlyOne Asia
HumoAir		HJ	USW	AKSAR	2023	2024	
Panorama Airways		5P	UZP		2021	2024	
Samarkand Airways		C7	UZS	SOGDIANA	2005		
Simurg Uzbekistan			JRP		1987	2000	

== See also ==
- List of airlines of Asia
