= Borneo Airways (1997–1999) =

Borneo Airways Sdn Bhd
IATA	ICAO	Call sign
BI	RBA	BRUNEI
- Founded: 1997
- Commenced operations: February 1998
- Ceased operations: August 31, 1999
- Hubs: Miri Airport
- Fleet size: 1
- Destinations: 4
- Parent company: Royal Brunei Airlines
- Headquarters: Miri, Sarawak, Malaysia

Borneo Airways was a Bruneian regional airline in operation from 1997 to 1999 based in Miri. It was a subsidiary of Royal Brunei Airlines.

== History ==
In 1997, the Borneo Airways brand was revived after Royal Brunei Airlines decided to cease its joint venture with Hornbill Skyways. It set up a partnership with Malaysia-based Corporate Centre Sdn.Bhd, for a new airline based in Malaysia, named Borneo Airways. The company operated via a single Dornier 228; and used Royal Brunei's airline codes and callsign. In 1999, only a year after the first flight, the partner carrier Royal Brunei Airlines indefinitely suspended operations on Borneo Airways' routes between Miri, Victoria and Gunung Mulu National Park in Malaysia and the Brunei capital Bandar Seri Begawan. The Borneo Airways flown its final flight before ceased operation on 31 August 1999.

== Fleet ==
A single 19-seater Dornier 228 (9M-BOR) leased from Royal Brunei Airlines.

== Destinations ==
- Brunei
  - Bandar Seri Begawan – Brunei International Airport - Hub
- Malaysia
  - Labuan – Labuan Airport
  - Miri – Miri Airport
  - Mulu – Mulu Airport

== See also ==
- Royal Brunei Airlines Flight 839 – a regional Royal Brunei flight that crashed in Miri, Malaysia in 1997
- RB Link – established in 2019, a new regional airliner operated under Royal Brunei Airlines
