= Subsidiaries of Royal Brunei Airlines =

Royal Brunei Airlines is the national air carrier of Brunei Darussalam. In addition to its airline business, it also has a number of subsidiaries.

== Abacus Distribution Systems ==
Abacus Distribution Systems (Brunei) is a local distributor for the Abacus Global Distribution System in Brunei. The Abacus GDS is a subsidiary of Sabre Holdings. The Brunei local distribution agency of Abacus was established in August 1990. Abacus Brunei is jointly owned by Royal Brunei Airlines and Abacus International. Abacus provides travel information and reservations tailored to the Asia-Pacific region, with 30 travel agents with more than 140 terminals in Brunei.

== Brunei International Air Cargo Centre ==
Brunei International Air Cargo Centre (BIACC) is a joint-venture company set up in 2002 between Royal Brunei Airlines as the majority shareholder, Circle Freight International, and Royal Brunei Technical Services (RBTS) to handle air cargo activities into and out of Brunei. The BIACC also provides service to international freight operators including FedEx at the Brunei International Airport.

== Mulaut Abattoir ==
The Mulaut Abattoir is located in Mulaut in the Brunei-Muara District. Mulaut Abattoir Sdn. Bhd. was privatised in August 1990. It provides Islamic-sanctioned slaughtering facilities to local farmers and butchers, as well as for the Islamic rituals of Qurban, Aqiqah, and other religious ceremonies. The abattoir also sells halal meat to the public, and supplies Royal Brunei Airlines' inflight catering, via Royal Brunei Catering.

== RBA Golf Club ==
RBA Golf Club, the first 18-hole public course, is close to Brunei International Airport, and twenty minutes drive from Bandar Seri Begawan. It was designed by Max Wexler. With the holes spread along and to the west of the airport runway, it is characterised by a slightly hilly layout, with lakes spread out over the course that serve to irrigate the course. A double-storey floodlit driving range is available.

== Royal Brunei Catering ==
Royal Brunei Catering (RBC) was formerly Dairy Farm (Brunei) and was established as a joint venture between Dairy Farm and Royal Brunei Airlines in 1975 to operate the flight kitchen at Brunei International Airport. In addition to this, it also operated an ice cream parlour at Darussalam Plaza on Jalan Sultan in Bandar Seri Begawan. When Royal Brunei Airlines purchased the shares held by Dairy Farm, the company was renamed Royal Brunei Catering Sdn Bhd.

RBC operates the flight kitchen at Brunei International Airport, the Express Fast Food chain in Brunei, and a number of restaurants in Bandar Seri Begawan, including two halal Chinese restaurants - Emperor's Court and Dynasty.

=== Royal Brunei Trading ===
Royal Brunei Trading is a subsidiary of Royal Brunei Catering. It operates a number of duty-free shops in Brunei International Airport and is part owner of the McDonald's franchise in Brunei.

== Royal Brunei Engineering ==
Royal Brunei Engineering Sdn Bhd (RBEng) was formed from the Engineering Department, the Engineering and Maintenance arm of Royal Brunei Airlines (RBA). RBEng was spun off as a subsidiary of RBA in early 2005, the national flag carrier of Government of Brunei.

RBE specialised in heavy maintenance of Boeing 757 and Boeing 767 up to '12C' and 'Structural 4C' checks, major modifications, SB's, AD's, pylon modification, cabin re-configuration, aircraft painting, and re-weigh. It also provided similar services to the Airbus A320 family of aircraft. International customers of RBE included Air Mauritius, Ansett Worldwide, Britannia Airways, Thai VietJet Air, Turkmenistan Airlines and Vietnam Airlines.

In November 2007, the Board directed the subsidiary to cease third party maintenance activities and to concentrate on maintaining the airline's own aircraft.
