= Royal Brunei =

Royal Brunei may refer to:

- Royal Brunei Airlines and its subsidiaries and associated facilities:
  - Royal Brunei Catering
  - Royal Brunei Engineering
  - Royal Brunei Airlines Golf Club
  - Royal Brunei Recreation Club
  - Royal Brunei Trading
- Royal Brunei Armed Forces and its individual service branches:
  - Royal Brunei Land Force
  - Royal Brunei Navy
  - Royal Brunei Air Force
  - Royal Brunei Support Service
  - Royal Brunei Training Institute
- Royal Brunei Executive - the arm of the Brunei Government that operates and maintains the executive fleet for the Brunei royal family
- Royal Brunei Police
- Royal Brunei Yacht Club
