= Vision Air Malaysia =

Charter airline of Malaysia (2000-2003)

Vision Air (M) Sdn Bhd
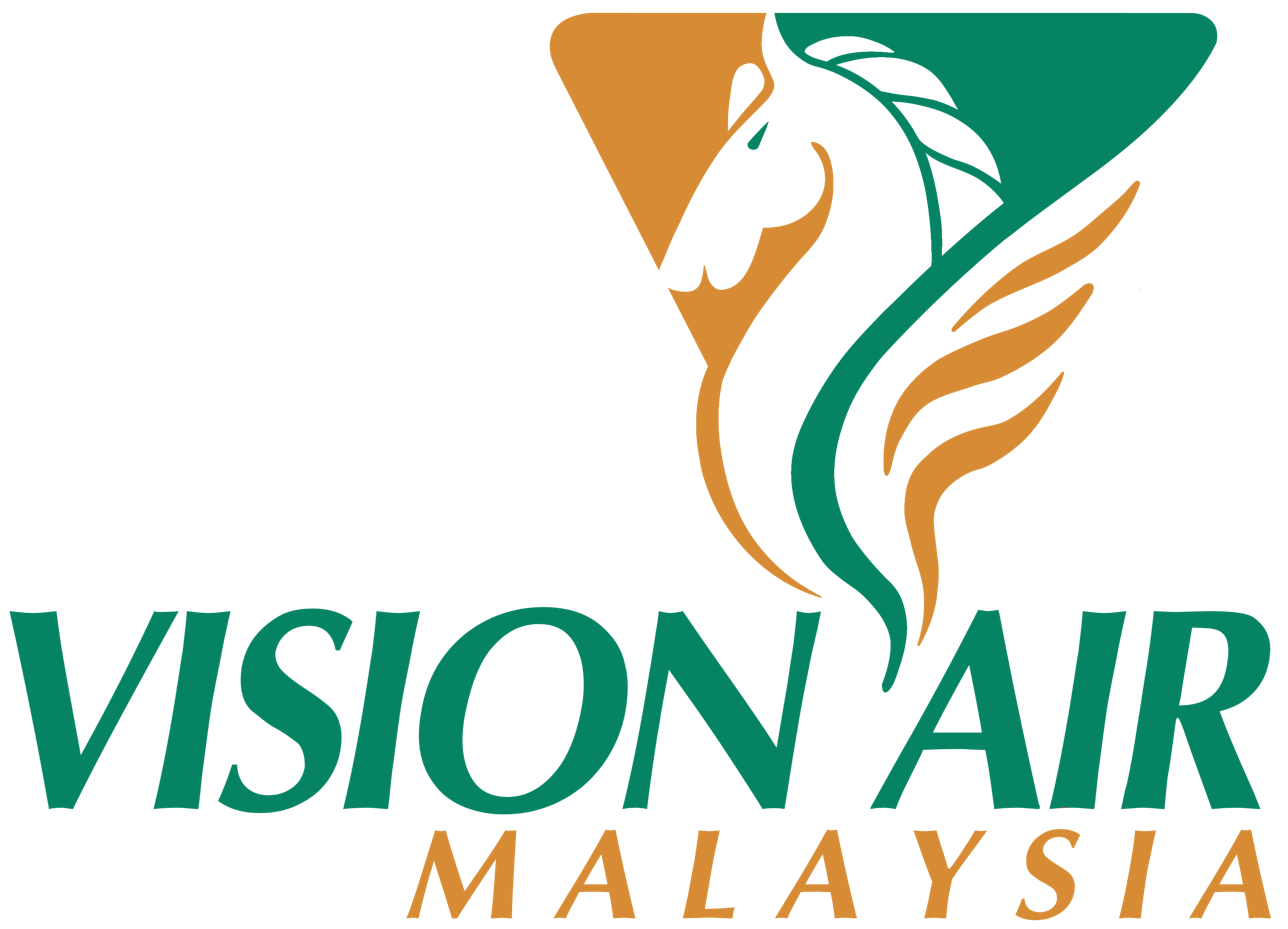
- Founded: December 1, 2000; 25 years ago
- Commenced operations: January 2001; 25 years ago
- Ceased operations: 31 March 2003; 23 years ago (merged into Hornbill Skyways)
- Hubs: Miri Airport
- Fleet size: 2
- Destinations: 3
- Parent company: Hornbill Skyways; Vision Air
- Headquarters: RIHGA Royal Hotel, Miri, Sarawak, Malaysia
- Website: www.visionair.com.my

Vision Air Malaysia was a regional charter airline operating in Malaysia. It was a subsidiary of Vision Air, a regional carrier based in the United States.

== History ==
Following Hornbill Skyways's end of its partnership with Merpati Intan, which was subsequently rebranded as Borneo Airways, Hornbill Skyways began a partnership with Vision Air. As a result, Vision Air Malaysia begin operation in January 2001 and became Malaysia's first aerial tour airline.

The airline had planned to expanding more operation to Brunei, Kalimantan, Southern Philippines and Labuan.

However in March 2003, Vision Air Malaysia lost most of its operations to Hornbill Skyways as they announced to took over Vision Air Malaysia's aircraft and operations in 1 April.

== Destinations ==
As of October 2002, Vision Air Malaysia operates to the following destinations:

Malaysia

- Sabah
  - Kota Kinabalu - Kota Kinabalu International Airport
- Sarawak
  - Bario - Bario Airport
  - Kuching - Kuching International Airport
  - Miri - Miri Airport
  - Mukah - Mukah Airport
  - Mulu - Mulu Airport
  - Sarikei - Tanjung Manis Airport
  - Sibu - Sibu Airport

== Fleet ==
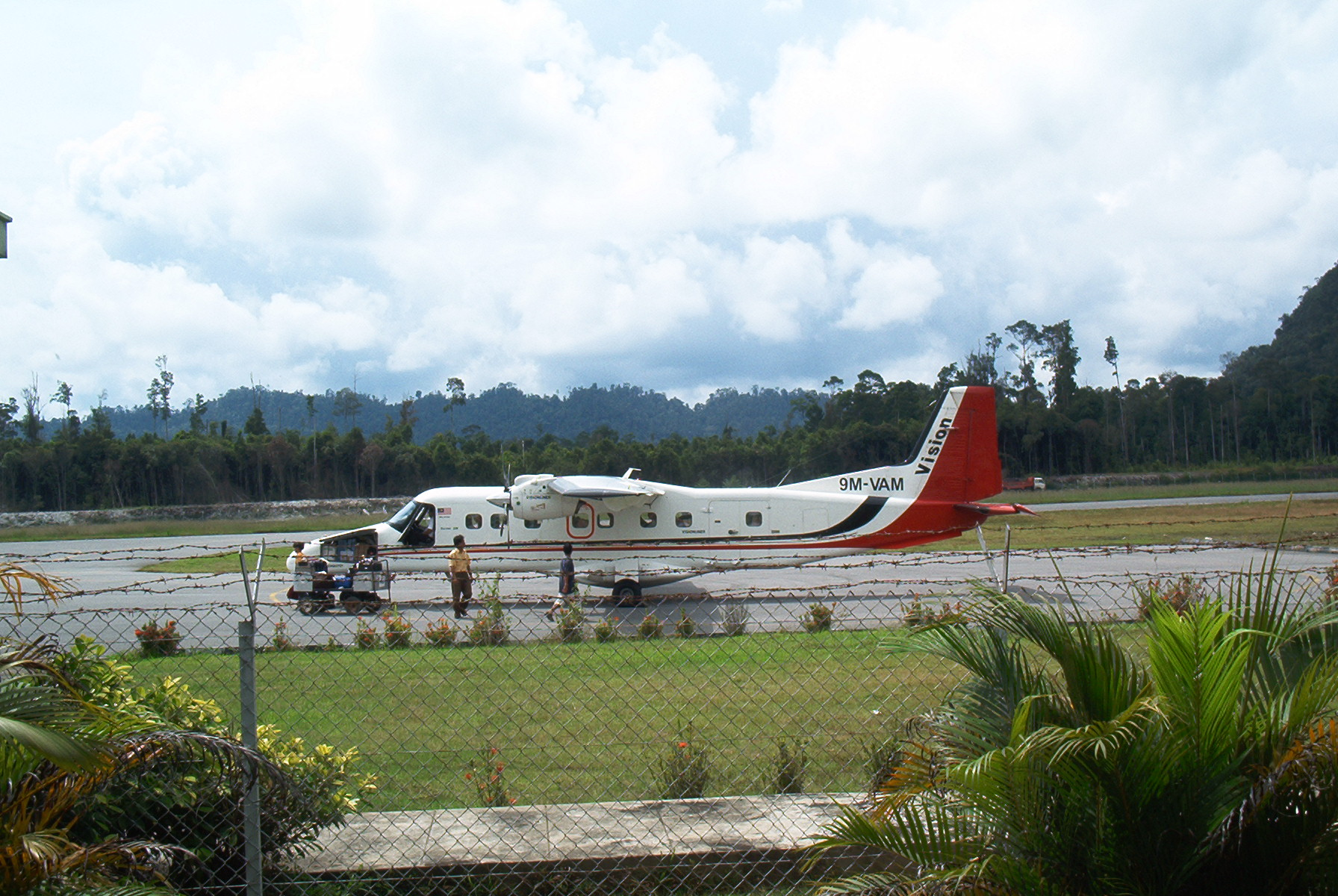
Vision Air Malaysia Dornier 228-212 departure at Mulu Airport

The Vision Air Malaysia fleet consisted of the following aircraft:

Vision Air Malaysia fleet
Aircraft	Total	Introduced	Retired
Dornier 228-212	1	2001	2003
Dornier 228-202K	1	2001	2003

== See also ==
- List of defunct airlines of Malaysia
