= Vision Air =

Vision Air can refer to one of several airlines

- Vision Air, the Moldovan airline that was later rebranded as Sky Up Nistru
- Vision Air Ltd, the executive charter division of Western Air of the Bahamas
- Vision Airlines of the United States
  - Vision Air Malaysia, its former Malaysian subsidiary
