= Mulaut Abattoir =

Bruneian company

Coordinates: 4.8566925°N 114.8398183°E

Logo of Mulaut Abattoir

Mulaut Abattoir Sdn Bhd is a slaughterhouse located in Brunei. It processes and supplies halal meat and slaughtering facilities to the public. It also supplies meat to Royal Brunei Airlines catering operations.

== History ==
The abattoir at Jalan Kilanas-Bebatik was first established by the government of Brunei to slaughter meat imported from Australia according to the Muslim halal methods for local consumption in Brunei. It was privatised in August 1990 as Mulaut Abattoir Sdn Bhd and is a subsidiary of Royal Brunei Airlines.

== Facilities ==
The Mulaut Abattoir is located in Mukim Kilanas in the Brunei-Muara District, about 12 km from Bandar Seri Begawan, the capital city of Brunei. The abattoir is located on a 16 hectares site in what was formerly a mainly agricultural area, although recent developments of the surrounding areas have placed it in a mostly residential area. It operates in strict accordance with the requirements of Islamic Laws and provides Islamic-sanctioned slaughtering facilities to local farmers and butchers, as well as for the Islamic rituals of Qurban, Aqiqah and other religious ceremonies. The abattoir also sells halal meat to the public and supplies Royal Brunei Airlines' inflight catering, via Royal Brunei Catering. Most of the personnel from Mulaut Abattoir Sdn Bhd have been trained in Australia to master their butchering skills.

Mulaut Abattoir is one of the five companies selected to be in the first phase of Hazard Analysis and Critical Control Point (HACCP) certificate programme. This is an attempt to increase the volume of "Brunei Premium Halal" products exported to other countries by obtaining HACCP certification for those products.

Mulaut Abattoir also imports live prime Angus steer from Victoria, South Australia in air-conditioned ships to be slaughtered in the halal way. Cows, goats and buffaloes are also imported from Australia, particularly from the Northern Territory, in air-conditioned ships.
