= Royal Brunei Airlines Flight 839 =

1997 aviation accident in Malaysia

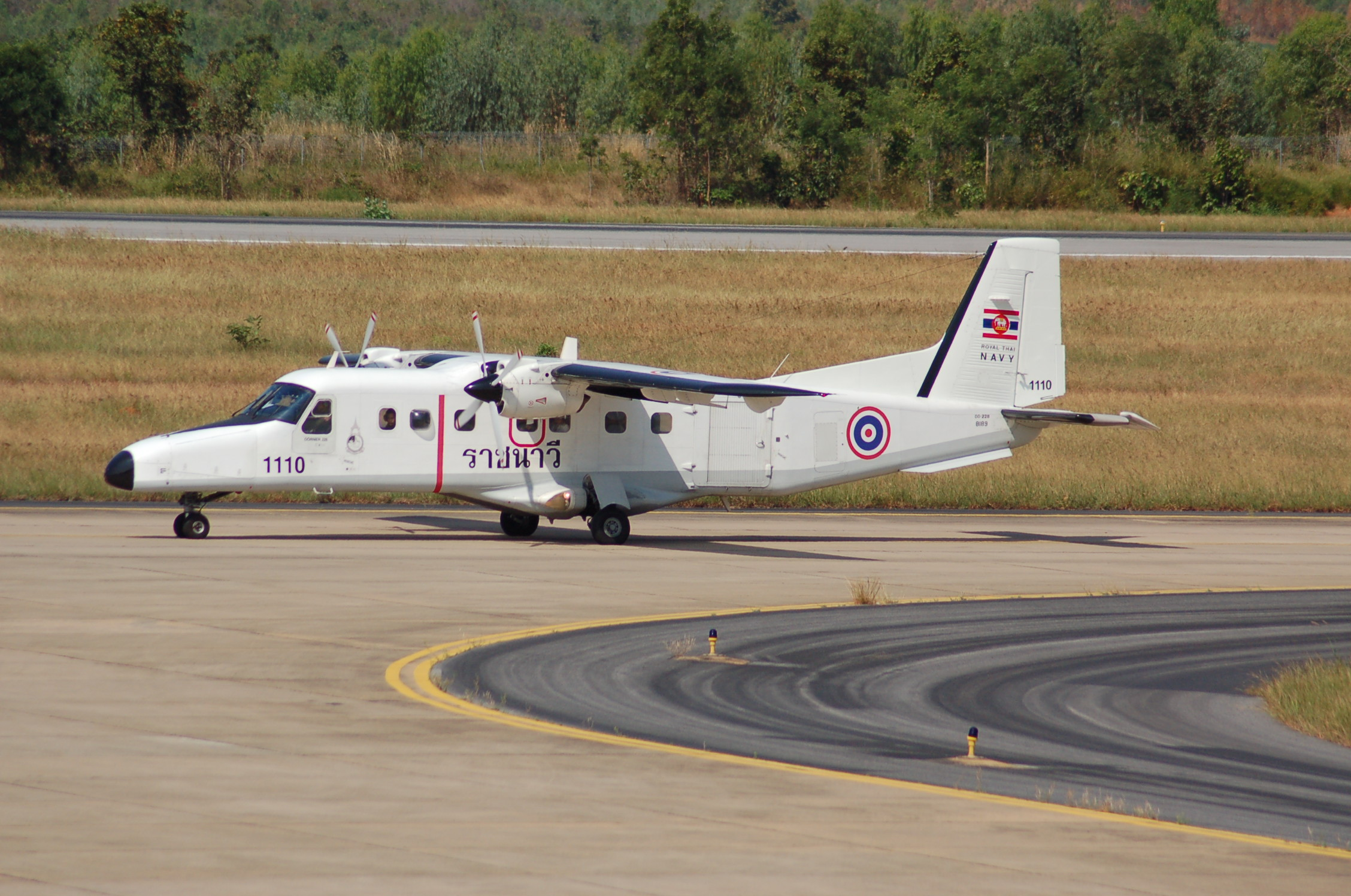
- A Dornier 228 similar to the accident aircraft

Accident
- Date: 6 September 1997
- Summary: Controlled flight into terrain due to pilot error
- Site: Lambir Hills National Park near Miri Airport, Miri, Malaysia; 4°12′14.4″N 113°57′40.32″E

Aircraft
- Aircraft type: Dornier 228-212
- Operator: Merpati Intan on behalf of Royal Brunei Airlines
- IATA flight No.: BI839
- ICAO flight No.: RBA839
- Call sign: BRUNEI 839
- Registration: 9M-MIA
- Flight origin: Labuan International Airport, Victoria, Labuan
- Stopover: Brunei International Airport, Bandar Seri Begawan Brunei
- Destination: Miri Airport, Miri, Malaysia
- Occupants: 10
- Passengers: 8
- Crew: 2
- Fatalities: 10
- Survivors: 0

Royal Brunei Airlines Flight 839 was a charter flight from Labuan to Bandar Seri Begawan and Miri, operated by Merpati Intan on behalf of Royal Brunei Airlines. On 6 September 1997, a Dornier 228, registered as 9M-MIA, conducting the flight crashed on approach to Miri, killing both crew members and all eight passengers on board.

== Crew and Passengers ==
The pilot-in-command was 40-year-old Captain Mohammad Tarmizi Muda, he was a former military pilot, and had a total of 3,947 flight hours, 783 were on the Dornier 228; The pilot-monitoring was 29-year-old First Officer Wong Lein Yee, with 1,120 total flight hours, he had 22 hours of experience on the Dornier 228.

Nationality	Passengers	Crew	Total
Malaysia	4	2	6
Japan	2	0	2
Sri Lanka	1	0	1
Singapore	1	0	1
Total	8	2	10

Aboard the aircraft were eight passengers and two crew members. Among the passengers were two Japanese tourists, one Sri Lankan, and one Singaporean national, while the remaining four passengers and both crew members were Malaysian.

== Accident ==
Flight 839, a Dornier 228, departed from Brunei International Airport at 19:13 local time with eight passengers and two pilots on board for a short-haul flight to Miri Airport. The crew of Flight 839 requested clearance to land at the airport. Air traffic control cleared the flight for the final approach to Runway 2 at Miri Airport in Sarawak, Malaysia, but the flight crew did not radio back the control. At 19:42 whilst on approach to the runway, Flight 839 crashed into a slope at 500 metres (1,600 ft) in Lambir Hills National Park. The wreckage of the Dornier 228 was found at 07:10 the following morning. According to Bernama, the crash was the second to occur in Miri, following an aviation accident on 3 September 1991 which killed 14 people, and was the sixth to occur in Malaysia in 1997.

== See also ==
- Aviastar Flight 7503
