= Lambir Hills National Park =

National park in Malaysia

- Taman Negara Bukit Lambir
- IUCN category II (national park)
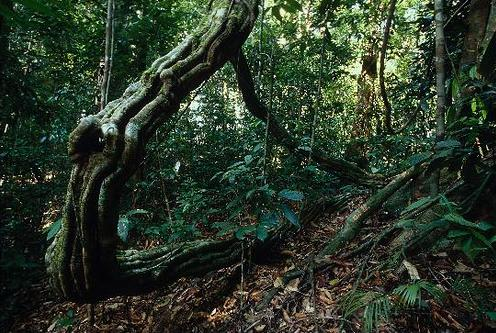
- Dense understorey of mixed dipterocarp forest in the park

- Location within East Malaysia
- Location: Sarawak, Malaysia
- Nearest city: Miri
- Coordinates: 4°12′47″N 114°01′48″E
- Area: 6,952 ha (17,180 acres)
- Established: 1975
- Website: www.sarawakforestry.com/htm/snp-np-lambir.html

The Lambir Hills National Park (Malay: Taman Negara Bukit Lambir) is a national park in Miri Division, Sarawak, Malaysia, on the island of Borneo. It is a small park, at 6,952 hectares (17,180 acres), and is composed largely of mixed dipterocarp forest, with some small areas of 'kerangas' (heath forest). The park is 150–465 m (492–1,526 ft) above sea level.

== Animal life ==
Biologists have recorded 237 species of birds, 64 species of mammals, 46 species of reptiles and 20 species of frogs in the national park. Large mammals such as gibbons and sun bear are absent or very rare due to the small size of the forest and illegal hunting. More recent surveys (2003–2007), however, failed to find 20% of the park's resident bird species and 22% of the mammal species, losses that include half of the park's primate species and six out of seven hornbill species. Collapse in population of large mammals and birds is an ecological disaster in Lambir.

The park's invertebrates include the Rajah Brooke's Birdwing butterfly (Trogonoptera brookiana) and more than 300 species of ants. Leeches are rare.

== Plant life ==
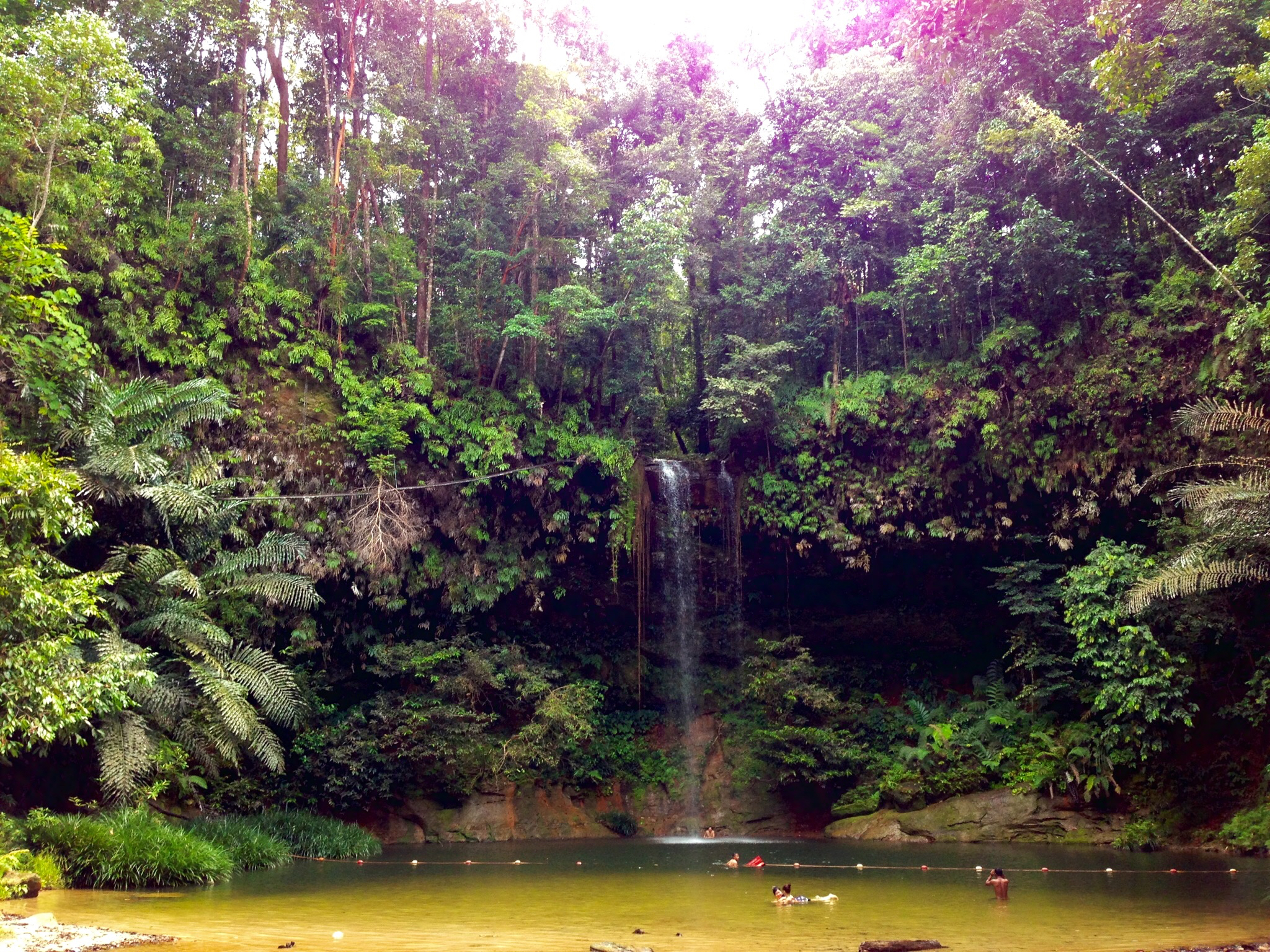
Lambir Hills Waterfall.

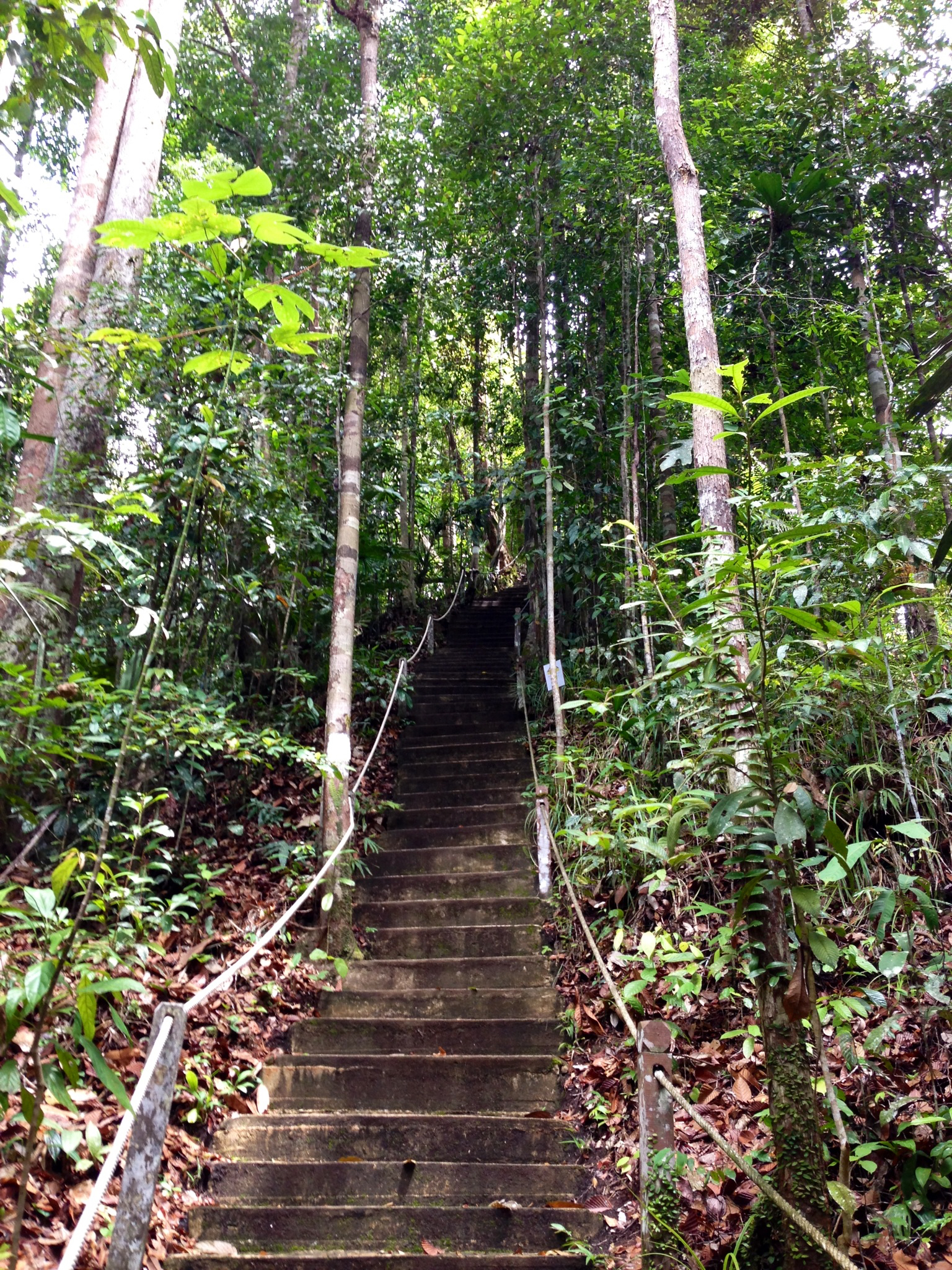
One of the many hiking trails in Lambir Hills National Park.

In 1991, the Sarawak Forest Department, Center for Tropical Forest Science/Harvard University, and the Plant Ecology Laboratory of Osaka City University, Japan created the Lambir Hills Forest Dynamics Plot. This is a 52-hectare (130-acre) area of the forest in which all trees thicker than 1.5 cm at breast height have been measured, mapped and identified. Every few years, researchers do a census of these trees so they can track their growth and changes in the population structure of each species. A census of all trees in the plot found 1175 different species. This gives Lambir Hills National Park possibly the highest diversity of trees of any forest in the Old World.

The dominant family of trees in the park is the Dipterocarpaceae, whose members include Shorea and Dryobalanops species. As Lambir Hills National Park is the last intact patch of lowland dipterocarp forest left in Sarawak it is an important refuge for species that have been heavily logged elsewhere.

Among the tallest trees in the national park is the tapang (Koompassia excelsa), which can grow more than 80 metres tall, and which honey bees like to build their hives on. Other interesting plants in the park include several species of Macaranga that have formed a symbiotic relationship with ants. The ants live inside the plants' hollow stems and protect them from herbivorous insects.

The pitcher plant Nepenthes hispida is found only in the park and surrounding area. The park has a very high diversity of figs (Ficus species), with nearly 80 species.

== Research ==
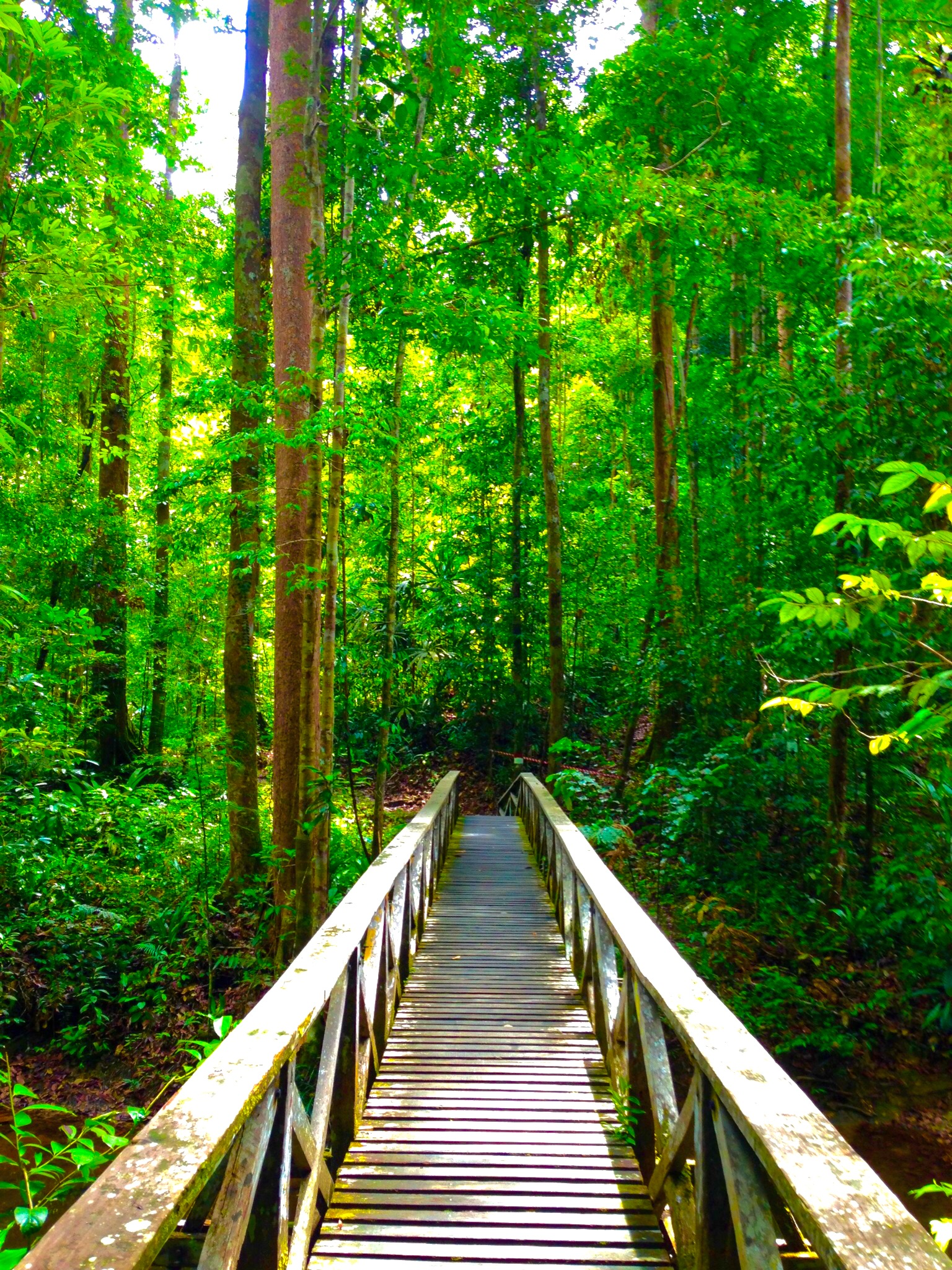
A wooden bridge.

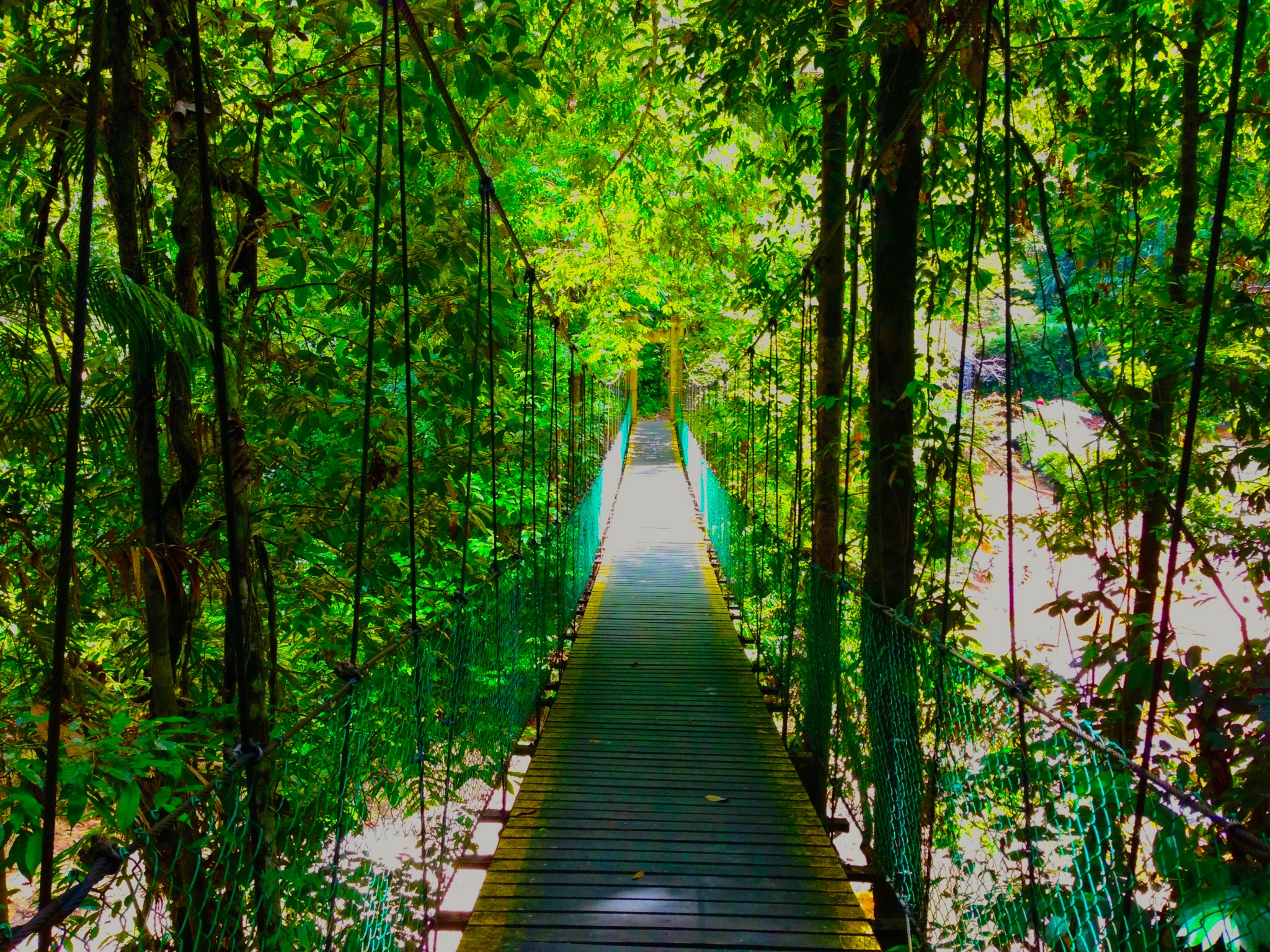
Lambir Hills Canopy Walkway.

Several research institutes have collaborated on long-term studies of the Lambir's natural history and many individual MSc or PhD students have completed their fieldwork there.

In addition to the Lambir Hills Forest Dynamics Plot mentioned above, Lambir has a series of tree towers, a canopy walkway and a canopy crane that researchers use to gain access to different parts of the forest's vertical structure.

== Tourism ==
There are several trails for tourists to explore. These range from short and fairly flat walks to the long and sometimes steep trek to the summit of Bukit Lambir, the tallest point in the park.

== Safety and incidents ==
- September 1997 – Royal Brunei Airlines Flight 839, a Dornier 228 aircraft, crashed into terrain within the park while on approach to Miri Airport, killing both crew members and all eight passengers on board. The wreckage of the Dornier 228 was found at 07:10 the following morning.
- June 2025 – Three teenage girls went missing while hiking in the park; seven firefighters were sent from Miri central Fire and rescue station for the rescue operation; they were found safe and escorted out by rescuers.
- July 2025 – Firefighters rescued 10 hikers experiencing health issues during a hike in the park.
- April 2026 – Two hikers were rescued after becoming stranded during a hike, with one sustaining a leg injury; according to the news, the rescue operation took approximately six hours.
