= RB Link =

Defunct Regional airline of Royal Brunei Airlines

IATA	ICAO	Call sign
BI	RBA	BRUNEI
- Founded: 2018
- Commenced operations: July 2019
- Ceased operations: 2020 (merged back to Royal Brunei Airlines)
- Hubs: Brunei International Airport
- Fleet size: 2
- Destinations: 5
- Parent company: Royal Brunei Airlines
- Headquarters: Bandar Seri Begawan, Brunei Darussalam
- Website: www.flyrb.com

RB Link was a regional airline brand owned by Royal Brunei Airlines under a joint partnership with Malindo Air.

== History ==
RB Link began its first flight on 29 July 2019 to Kota Kinabalu. It started with two brand new ATR 72-600 aircraft, operated by Malindo Air, to begin services. Royal Brunei Airlines used this brand to operate regional flights around Borneo, particularly to cities in Malaysia and Indonesia. It used the same IATA code as Royal Brunei Airlines with its base also at Brunei International Airport. All of its aircraft, maintenance, insurance and staff was provided by Malindo Air however the service and amenities onboard were provided by Royal Brunei Airlines. The staff was also trained to Royal Brunei Airlines service standards.

In March 2020, the airline announced that suspended its operation due to the coronavirus pandemic, border restrictions and the declining travel demand and consequently RB Link has been re-integrated back into parent Royal Brunei Airlines.

== Destinations ==
As of June 2020, RB Link operated services to the following destinations:

Country	City	Airport	Notes	Ref
Brunei	Bandar Seri Begawan	Brunei International Airport	Hub	
Malaysia	Bintulu	Bintulu Airport	Terminated	
Malaysia	Kota Kinabalu	Kota Kinabalu International Airport		
Malaysia	Kuching	Kuching International Airport		
Malaysia	Sandakan	Sandakan Airport		
Malaysia	Sibu	Sibu Airport		
Malaysia	Tawau	Tawau Airport		
