= Air Cargo Mongolia =

Mongolian airline

| IATA | ICAO | Call sign |
|---|---|---|
| - | MGC | MONGOLIA CARGO |
- Founded: 2007
- Hubs: Chinggis Khaan International Airport Uses for charter flights (UBN)
- Fleet size: 0
- Destinations: Charter flights to any domestic Asian and European destination
- Headquarters: Khan-Uul district, Ulaanbaatar, Mongolia
- Key people: P Baatarsuren, founder and CEO
- Website: www.aircargo.mn

Air Cargo Mongolia is a defunct Mongolian cargo airline. It received its air cargo operator's certificate (AOC) from the Civil Aviation Authority of Mongolia in May 2013 and was expected to launch its operation in 2014.

== Destinations ==
The airline operates charter flights to any domestic, Asian, or European destination. Range fully loaded 7540 км (4070 nm).

== Fleet ==
The Air Cargo Mongolia fleet includes the following aircraft (as of April 2025):

Air Cargo Mongolia fleet
| Aircraft | In service | Orders | Cargo | Routes |
|---|---|---|---|---|
| Boeing 737-300F | 0 | 0 | | Operated by Mongolian Airways (Cargo) until 2025 |

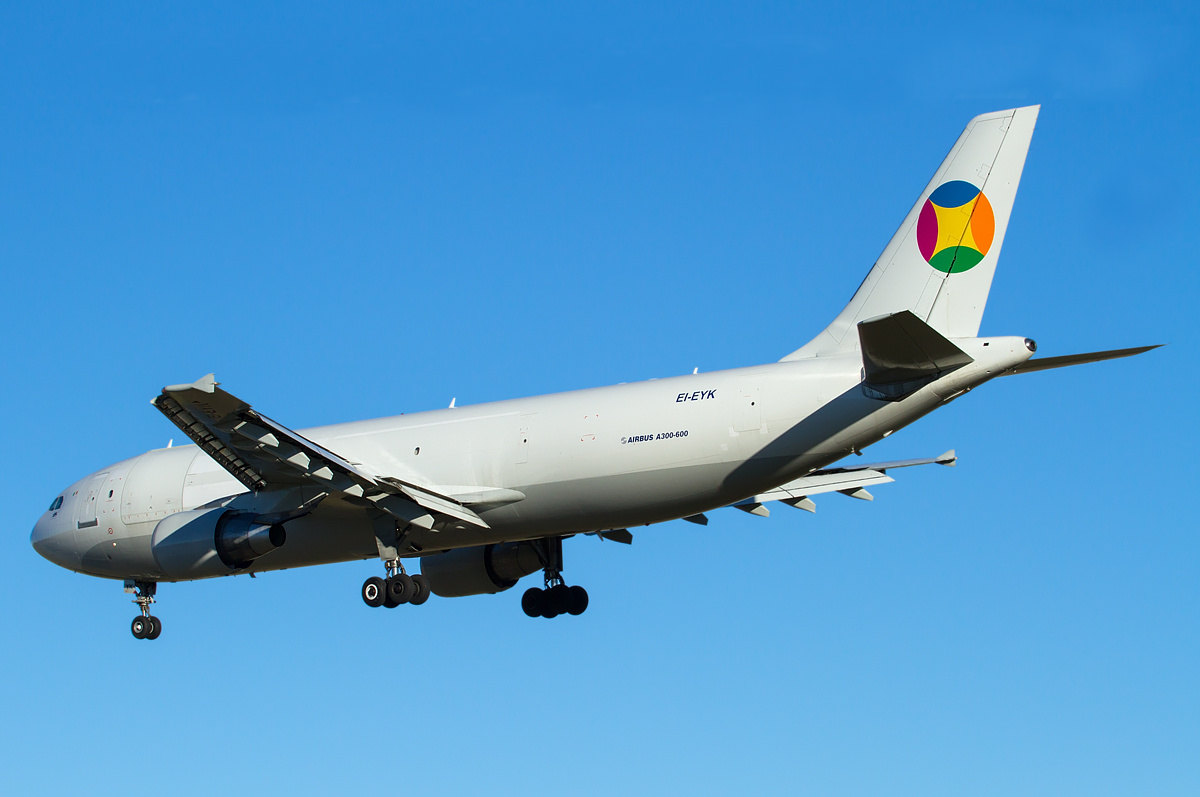
