= Bruneian =

Bruneian may refer to:

- Something of, or related to Brunei
- A person from Brunei, or of Bruneian descent. For information about the Bruneian people, see Demographics of Brunei and Culture of Brunei. For specific Bruneians, see List of Bruneians.
- There is no language called "Bruneian". See Languages of Brunei.
