= Royal Brunei Culinary =

Brunei food service company

Royal Brunei Culinary Sdn Bhd
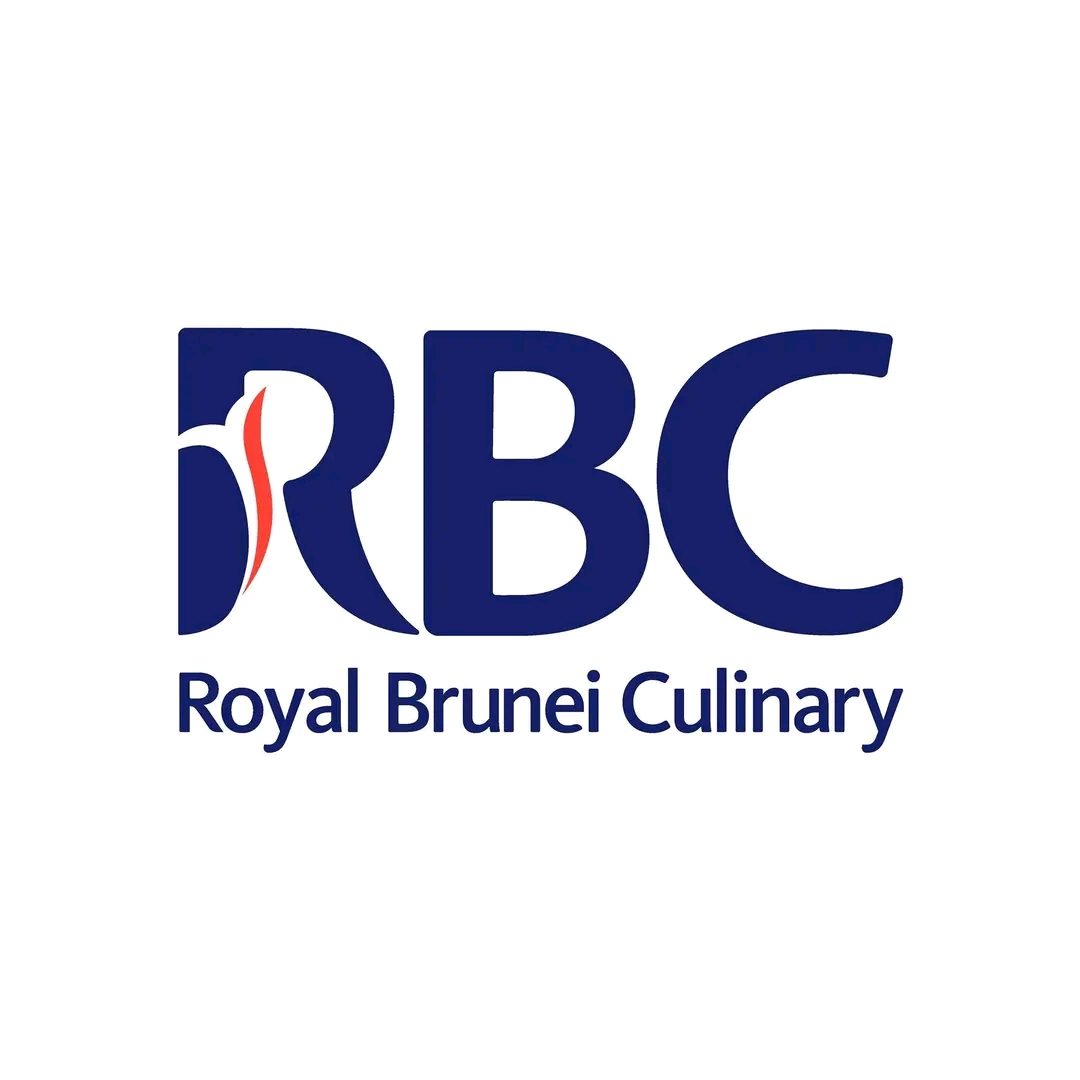
- Company type: Government-linked company (GLC)
- Industry: Food services & Catering
- Founded: 11 September 1975; 50 years ago
- Headquarters: Lambak Kanan West Industrial Park, Brunei Darussalam
- Key people: Haji Sofian bin Haji Mohammad Jani (Chairman); Haji Mohammad Yusree Bin Haji Junaidi (Deputy Chairman)
- Products: In-flight catering; Healthcare nutrition; Restaurants (Dynasty, Seasons, Anjung Saujana); Frozen-ready meals; Industrial laundry
- Parent: Darussalam Assets (100%)
- Subsidiaries: Royal Brunei Trading
- Website: www.royalbruneiculinary.com

Royal Brunei Culinary Sdn Bhd (commonly abbreviated as RBC) is a Bruneian government-linked company specializing in catering and food solutions. It operates the largest central kitchen in Brunei and serves as the primary caterer for Royal Brunei Airlines and national healthcare facilities.

== History ==
=== Dairy Farm (Brunei) ===
Royal Brunei Catering (RBC) started life as Dairy Farm (Brunei) and was established as a joint venture between Dairy Farm and Royal Brunei Airlines in 1975 to operate the flight kitchen at Brunei International Airport. In addition to this, it also operated an ice cream parlour and a grill restaurant at Darussalam Plaza on Jalan Sultan in Bandar Seri Begawan.

=== Renaming ===
When Royal Brunei Airlines purchased all the shares held by Dairy Farm in 1989 to become the sole proprietor, the company was renamed as Royal Brunei Catering Sdn Bhd (often abbreviated as RBC).

== Operations ==
=== Aircraft Catering Centre ===
RBC operates the flight kitchen at Brunei International Airport. The Aircraft Catering Centre produces 3,000 meals per day, catering for His Majesty's The Sultan Flight (HMSF), VIP Flights, and scheduled carriers such as Royal Brunei Airlines. Singapore Airlines has presented Royal Brunei Catering an award for Best Regional Caterer 1995/1996.

=== Fine dining restaurants ===
RBC operates six restaurants in Brunei. These are:

- Anjung Saujana at the Brunei International Airport
- Seasons Restaurant and Piano Lounge
- Dynasty Restaurant, a halal Chinese restaurant
- Horizon Seafood Restaurant At Waterfront Kampong Ayer Bandar
- Poolside Restaurant at the Royal Brunei Recreation Club, and
- Poolside Cafe at the Royal Brunei Recreation Club.

=== Other food-related operations ===
RBC also operates the Express Fast Food chain in Brunei and a number of bakeries in the Brunei-Muara district. It also provides ad hoc outside catering services, and industrial catering services to the Raja Istri Pengiran Anak Saleha (RIPAS) Hospital.

There is also a small goods manufacturing operation which includes the production of the Alfresco brand Ice Cream, bread, pastries and cakes for RBC Bakery & Pastry and a range of RBC Delicatessen products such as retail burgers and sausages. Most of these activities are based at the Aircraft Catering Centre.

In addition, Royal Brunei Catering also provides laundry and dry cleaning services via its chain of laundry shops.

== Royal Brunei Trading ==
Royal Brunei Trading is a subsidiary of Royal Brunei Airlines. It operates a number of duty-free shops in Brunei International Airport and is part owner of the McDonald's franchise in Brunei.
