= Hornbill Skyways =

Aircraft charter company in Malaysia

Hornbill Skyways Sdn Bhd

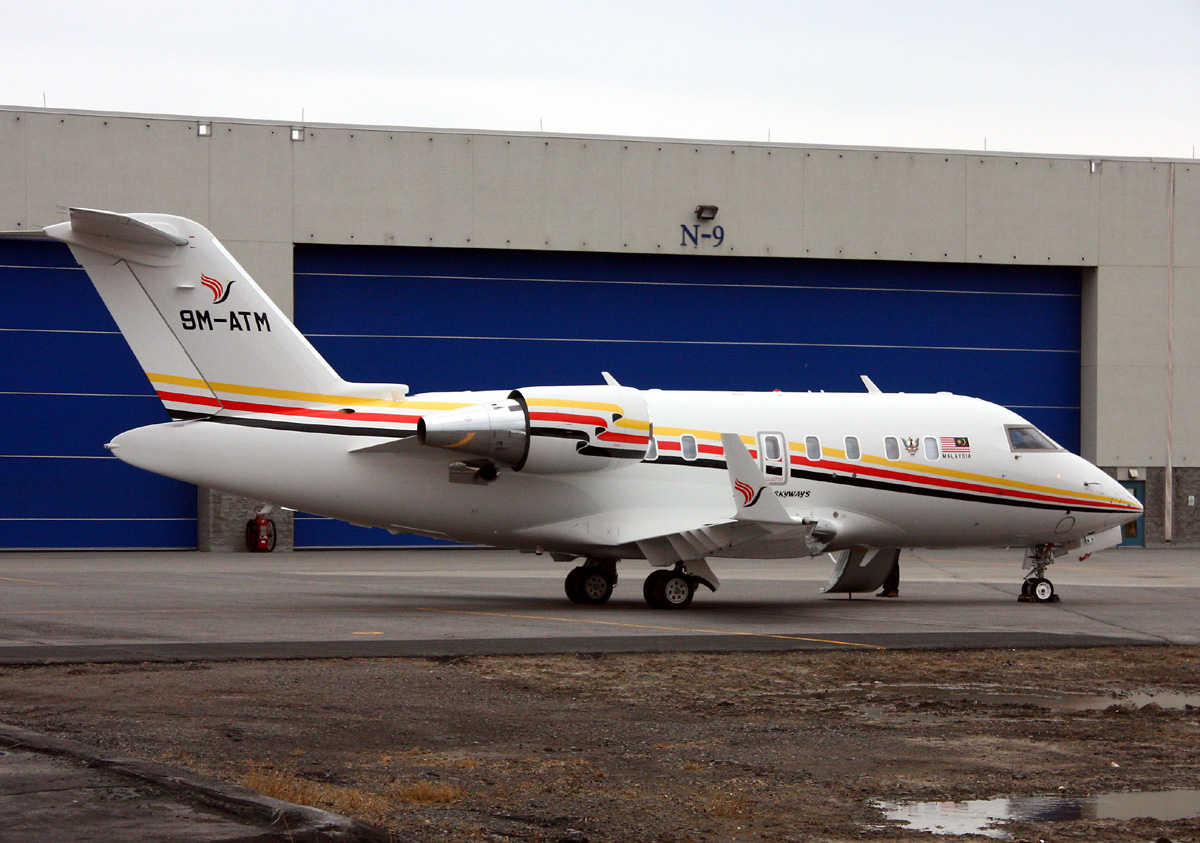
- Hornbill Skyways Challenger 605
- Founded: 10 May 1977; 49 years ago
- Operating bases: Kuching; Miri
- Fleet size: 14
- Headquarters: Kuching, Sarawak, Malaysia
- Key people: Capt. Wan Mohamad Ali Bin Hj Wan Abdullah (CEO, Accountable Manager)
- Website: www.hornbillskyways.com

Hornbill Skyways is a regional aircraft charter service operating in towns and rural areas in Sarawak. The company slogan is "Wings to your Destination".

The airline's head office is in North Pan Hangar at Kuching International Airport. It also has a corporate office in the city of Kuching and a regional office at Miri Airport.

== History ==
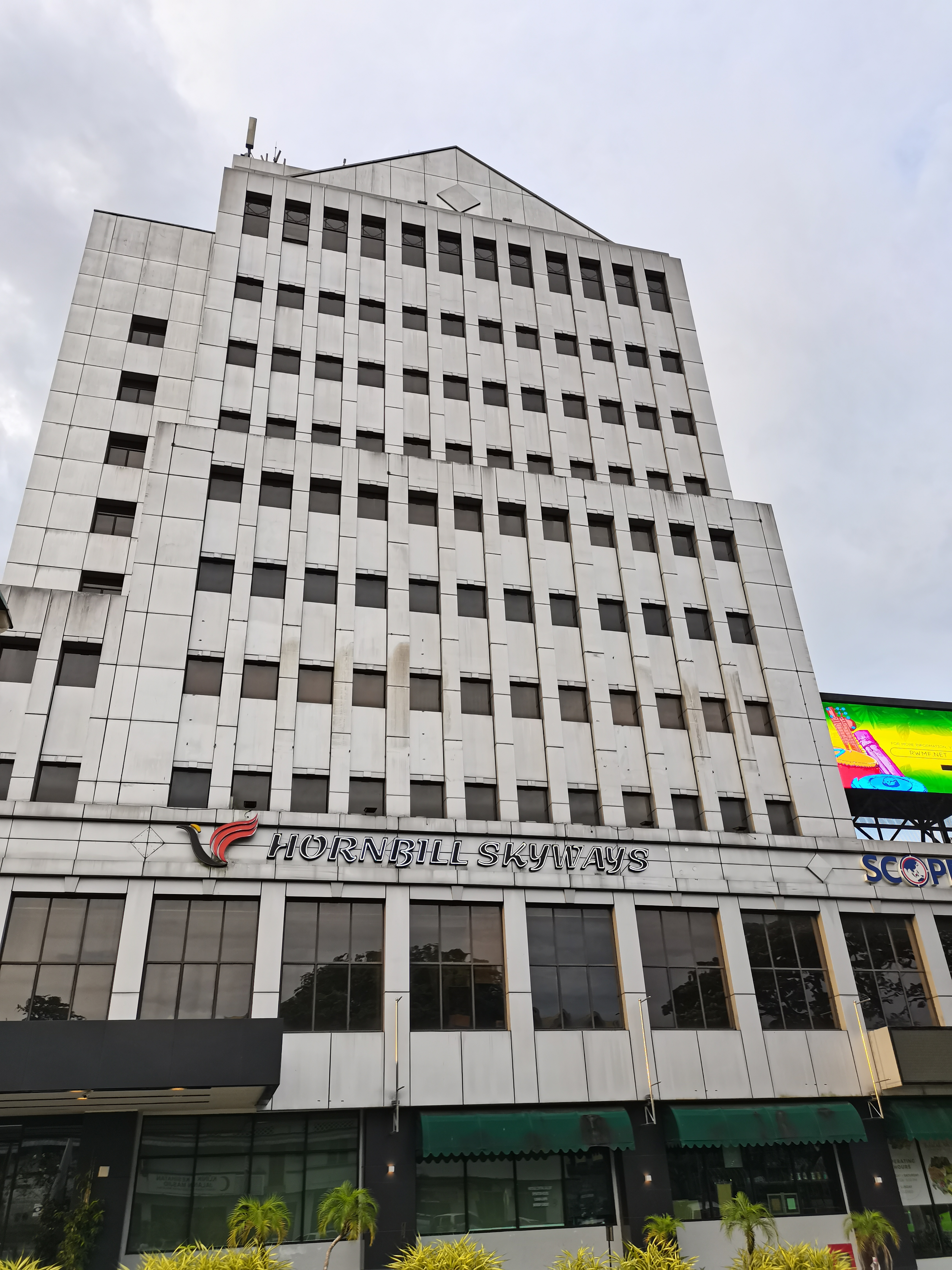
Hornbill Skyways office building in the Kuching city centre.

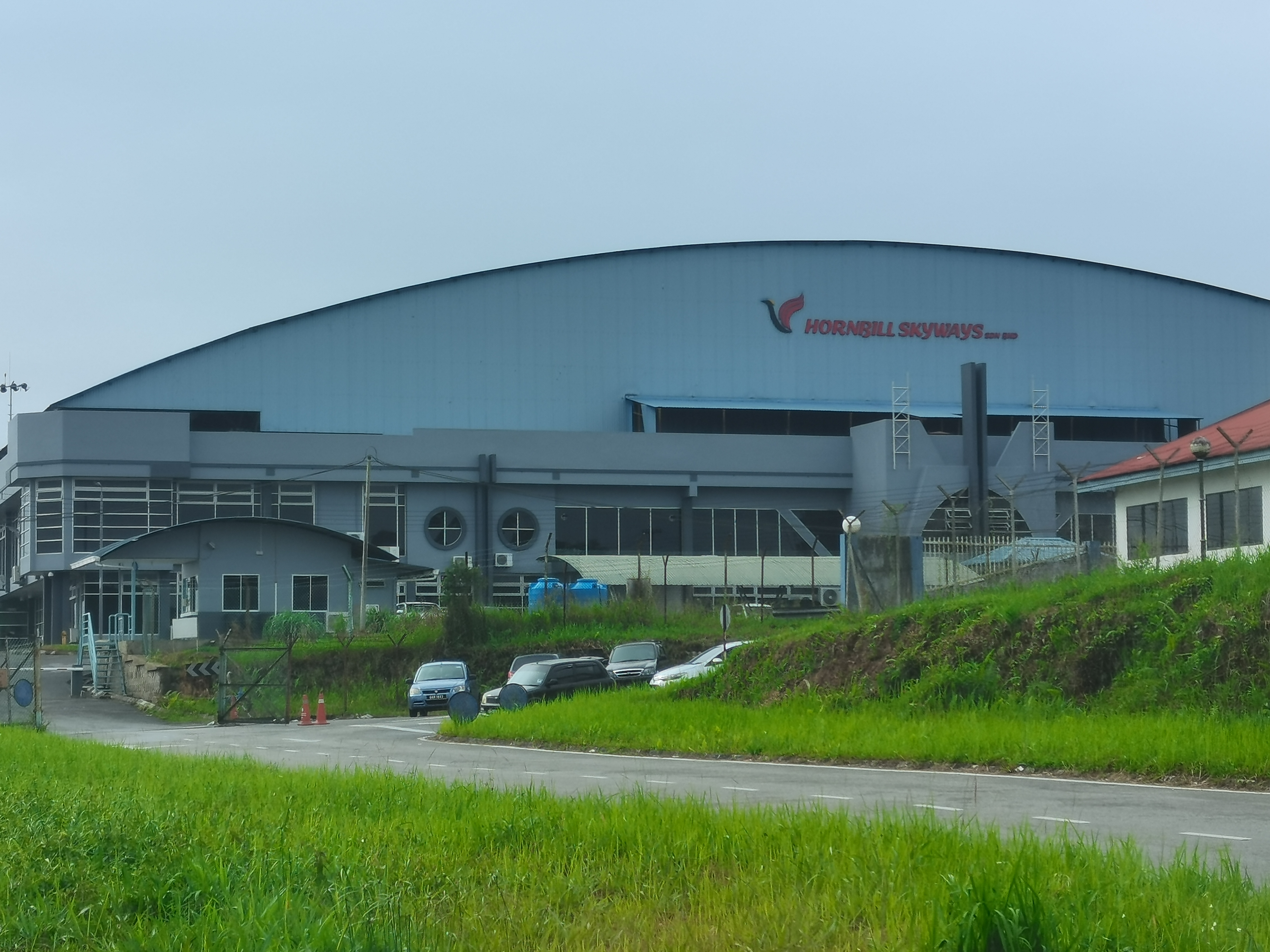
Hangar near Kuching International Airport

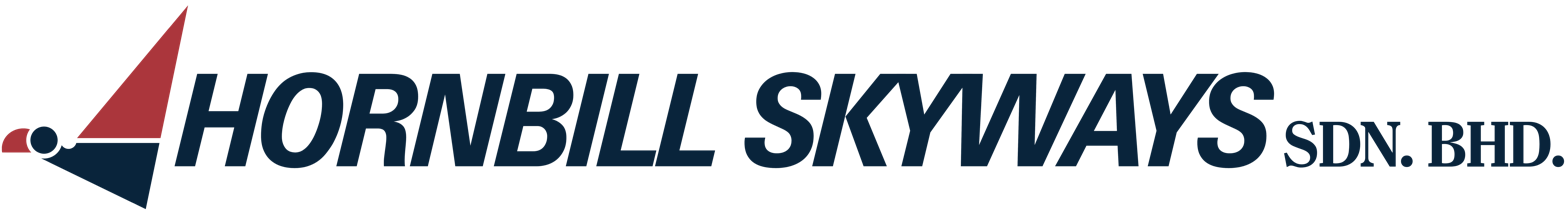
former logo of Hornbill Skyways used since 1978 until 1985

Hornbill Skyways was established in May 1977 as a private company operating one fixed-wing Cessna 421 and two Bell 206B Jet Ranger helicopters. The business idea was to provide air services to rural areas in Sarawak, as an alternative to river transportation at that time. In 1985, Hornbill Skyways was taken over by the government of Sarawak through share acquisition by Yayasan Sarawak (Sarawak Foundation) and Sarawak Timber Industry Development Corporation (STIDC). In 2007, the company had three fixed-wing aircraft and 11 helicopters.

In 1980s, Hornbill Skyways started flying doctor service (FDS) to serve rural population that are out of reach of public health clinics.

Since 1986, Hornbill Skyways helicopters are used to provide logistical operations to the interior during parliamentary and state elections.

As of 2007, the company logged a total of 130,000 flying hours.

The Government of Sarawak announced the plan of setting up its own boutique airline through Hornbill Skyways since December 2021. A memorandum of understanding was inked with Malaysian Aviation Group in 2023 to takover MASWings. A new company was created in May 2024 which was named "AirBorneo Holdings Sdn Bhd". In February 2025, the boutique airline was to be named "AirBorneo".

== Corporate affairs ==
The company main hangar is attached to Kuching International Airport. It also has a maintenance hangar in Miri Airport.

== Fleet ==
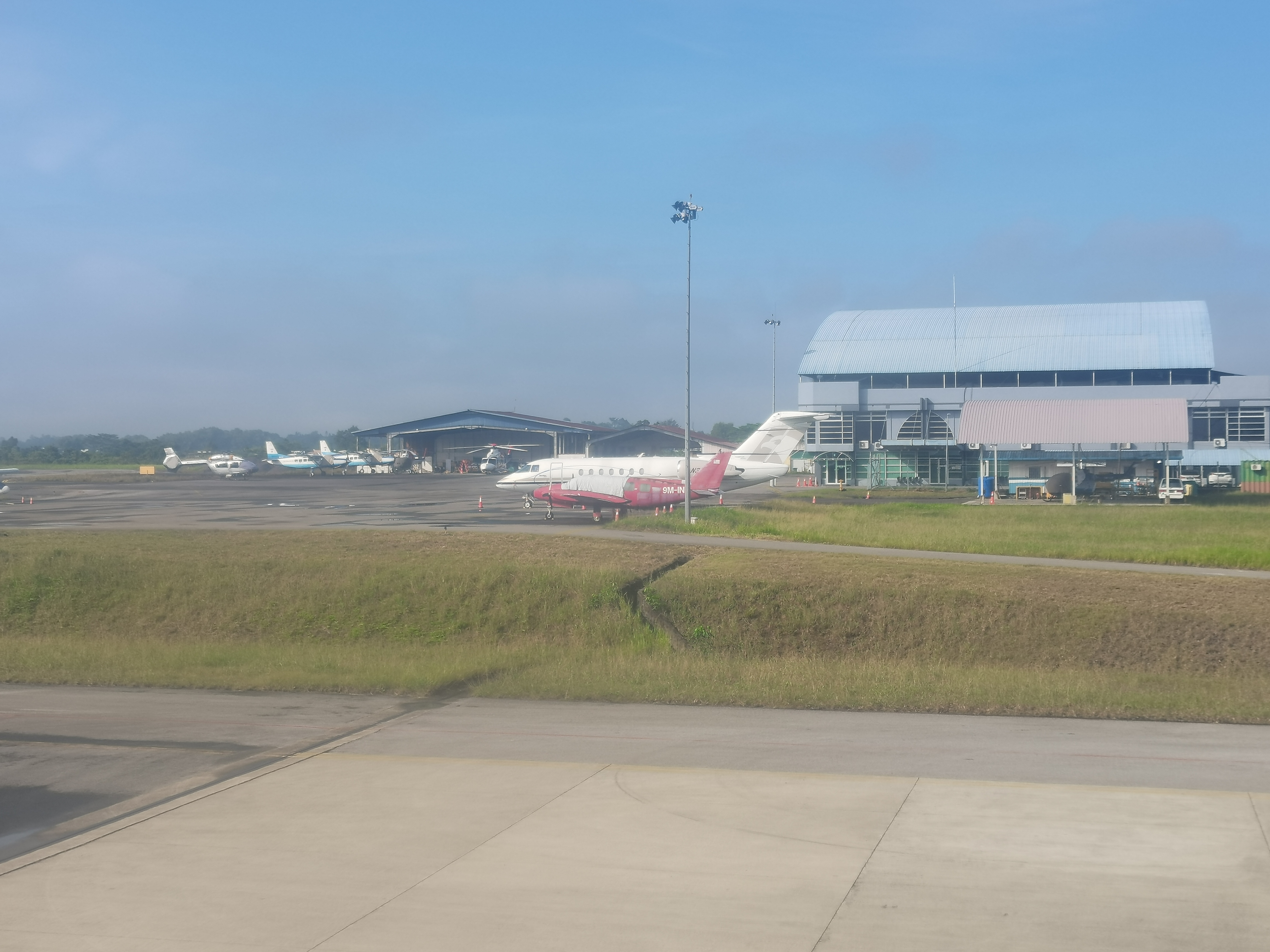
Hornbill Skyways hangar beside the Kuching International Airport.

Their current fleet consists of the following:

- 2 Bell 206L LongRanger IV
- 2 Bell 206B JetRanger
- 5 Eurocopter EC135 P2/P2+
- 1 Eurocopter EC 155 (for State Executive Flight)
- 1 Bombardier Challenger CL-605 (for State Executive Flight)
- 3 Beechcraft Super King Air -350I and B200GT (2 King Air 350i, 1 Super King Air B200GT)

=== Historical fleet ===
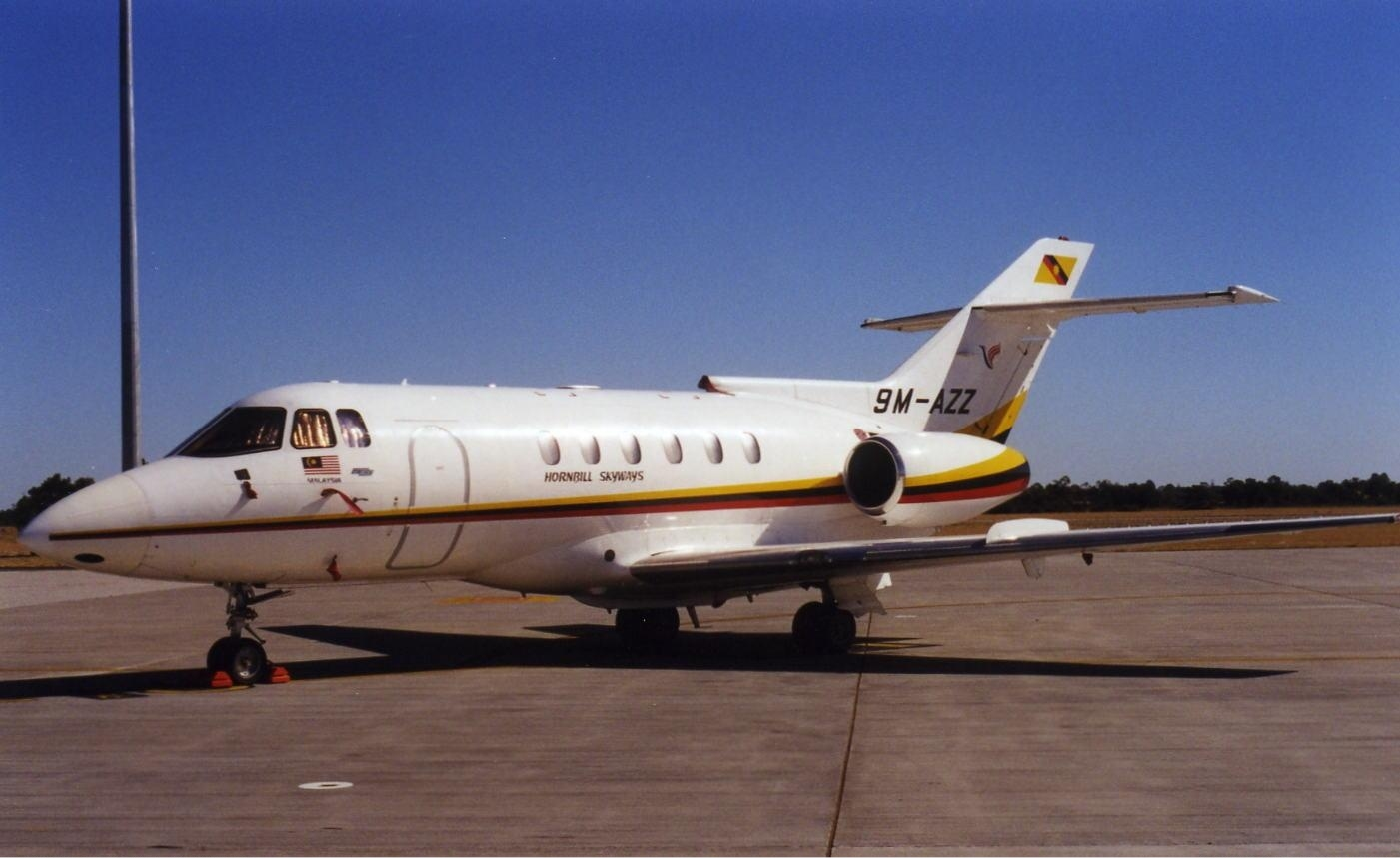
BAe 125 at Perth Airport (early 2000s)

- British Aerospace BAe 125
- Cessna 421
- Cessna Citation II
- Dornier 228
- Bell 430
- Cessna Citation X
- Airbus Helicopters H175

The aircraft in the fleet are for the exclusive use of Sarawak government officials. From 2003 until 2008, Hornbill Skyways operated and maintained Dornier 228 owned by Sarawak Timber Industry and Development Corporation (STIDC).

In 2003 Hornbill Skyways took over Vision Air Malaysia (subsidiary of Vision Airlines) together with 2 Dornier 228 after Vision Air Malaysia ceased operations. However Hornbill Skyways ceased operating the 2 Dornier 228 in 2008 when both aircraft were sold to other airline company in Mobile.

== Incidents and accidents ==
- On 30 July 1993, Shorts SC7 Skyvan 3-100 aircraft, carrying 17 passengers and two crew members, made an emergency landing at a football field at Long Loyang village when approaching the Marudi airport due to severe weather. One passenger died in the incident.
- On 17 July 2003, the company's Bell 206 helicopter crashed into Mount Murud after departing from a timber camp. Borneo Evangelical Mission pastor Kalip Basar and Captain Gabriel Ujie died in the crash.
- On July 12, 2004, a Bell 206L4 helicopter crashed into the jungle while flying from Bario to Ba'kelalan. All the seven people inside the helicopter including an assistant minister in the chief minister department, who was also the state assemblyman for the Ba'kelalan constituency, Judson Sakal Tagal were killed. Therefore, 2004 Ba'kelalan by-election was held to elect a new state assemblyperson. An investigation by the Civil Aviation Authority of Malaysia later attributed the cause to the helicopter flying at high altitude with low power margin during heavy rain and strong winds.
- On 3 September 2004, four people were killed in the privately chartered Bell helicopter when it crashed in Asajaya District, about five minutes after taking off from Kuching International Airport. Following the incident, Malaysian Ministry of Transport grounded all the 10 helicopters owned by Hornbill Skyways.
- Mohamed Asharat Ramzan Ali, a former general manager of the company from 15 March to 13 July 2005, filed an "unlawful dismissal claim" against Hornbill Skyways. He alleged that the company mishandled the purchase of the aircraft "Cessna Citation X". The claim was filed in 2007 and was heard in Kuala Lumpur industrial court. In 2013, the court decided that the termination of the general manager's job was done without a good reason and was entitled to maximum twelve months of salary back payment. However, the court did not take into account the allegations of Mohamed Asharat against the company as it is not related to the unlawful dismissal claim. Dissatisfied with the award, Mohamed Asharat filed an appeal to Kuala Lumpur high court in which the high court maintained the 2013 decision and pass back the case to Kuala Lumpur industrial court to determine the quantum of the back payment in 2017.
- On 25 July 2005, Bell 206 helicopter crashed at Bukit Batu Tiban near the Sarawak-West Kalimantan border, killing three out of four on board.
- On 5 May 2016, Eurocopter AS350 B3e chartered by the company crashed at Lupar River, Sarawak after it took off from Kuching International Airport. All six people on board were killed.
- On 24 September 2017, Super King Air, B200GT with registration 9M-WSK performed a non-scheduled flight from Mukah Airport to Kuching International Airport. The aircraft skidded off the runway upon landing at Kuching. All the passengers and crew were safely evacuated from the aircraft.
