= Royal Brunei Airlines =

State-owned flag carrier of Brunei

Coordinates: 4.9490545°N 114.9374719°E

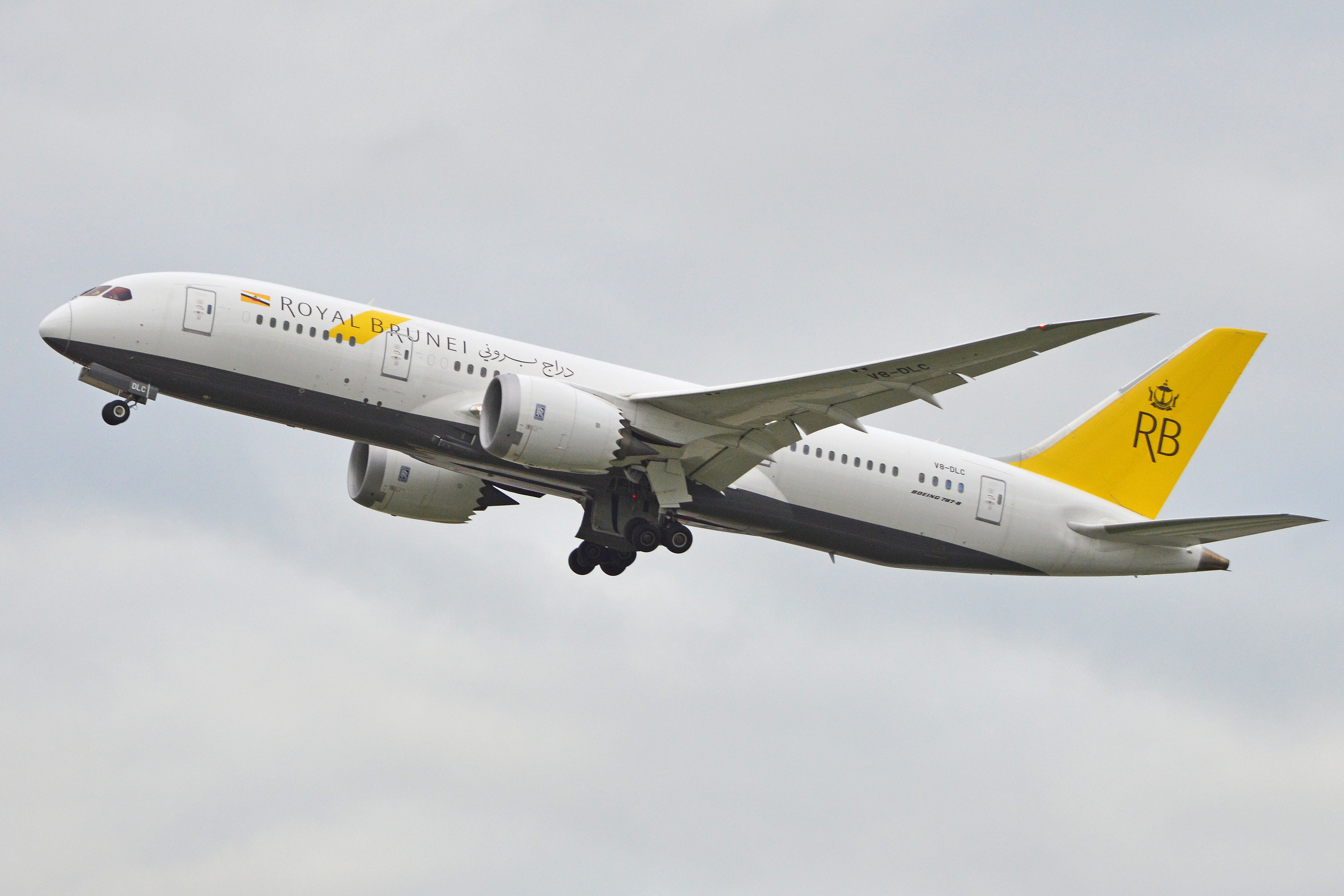
- Royal Brunei Airlines Boeing 787-8
IATA	ICAO	Call sign
BI	RBA	BRUNEI
- Founded: 18 November 1974; 51 years ago
- Commenced operations: 14 May 1975; 51 years ago
- Hubs: Brunei International Airport
- Frequent-flyer program: Royal Skies
- Subsidiaries: Royal Brunei Culinary
- Fleet size: 12
- Destinations: 22
- Parent company: Government of Brunei Darussalam; Darussalam Assets
- Headquarters: Bandar Seri Begawan, Brunei
- Key people: Chairman: Juanda Abdul Rashid; CEO: Sabirin Abdul Hamid
- Website: www.flyroyalbrunei.com

Royal Brunei Airlines Sdn Bhd (RB) (Note: Malay: Penerbangan DiRaja Brunei, Jawi: ڤنربڠن دراج بروني) is the flag carrier of Brunei, headquartered in the RB Campus in Bandar Seri Begawan. It is wholly owned by the Government of Brunei. Its hub is Brunei International Airport in Berakas, just to the north of Bandar Seri Begawan, the capital of Brunei.

Formed in 1974, with an initial fleet of two Boeing 737-200 aircraft, serving Singapore, Hong Kong, Kota Kinabalu, and Kuching, Royal Brunei Airlines now operates to 32 destinations throughout south-east Asia, as well as Europe and Oceania. Its fleet and type numbers increased progressively in the 1990s.

== History ==
=== Pre-independence ===
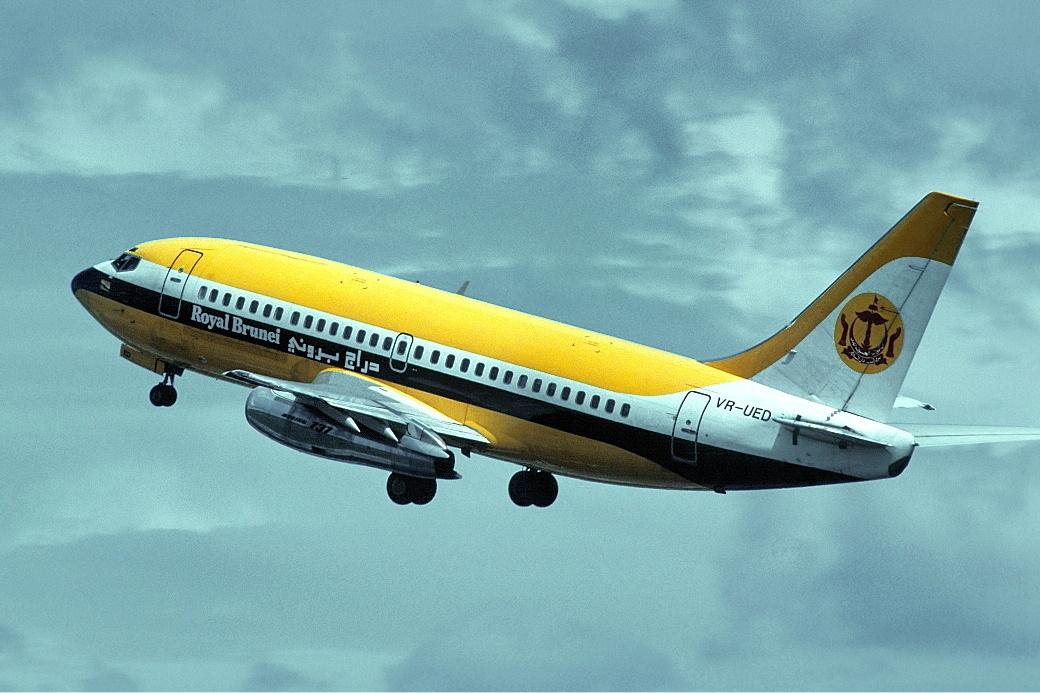
Boeing 737-200 (VR-UED) of Royal Brunei in 1983

Royal Brunei Airlines was established (as merely Royal Brunei) on 18 November 1974 with two, then new Boeing 737-200s. The airline's maiden voyage was on 14 May 1975 from the then newly built Brunei International Airport to Singapore. Flights to the then British colony of Hong Kong, and the city of Kota Kinabalu and Kuching in East Malaysia (Malaysian Borneo) started the same day.

Early route expansion included services to Manila in 1976, and Bangkok in 1977. Three years later, Royal Brunei acquired a Boeing 737-200QC, its third Boeing 737, enabling it to reach Kuala Lumpur in 1981 and Darwin in 1983.

=== From national independence: 1984–1991 ===
After the independence of Brunei from the United Kingdom on 1 January 1984, services commenced to Jakarta on 3 January, thus linking all five ASEAN capital cities at the time from Brunei: Bangkok, Jakarta, Kuala Lumpur, Manila, and Singapore.

Three Boeing 757-200s were purchased in the mid-1980s, to enable the airline to expand to Taipei in 1986 and Dubai in 1988. They were also used on existing high-capacity routes to Singapore, Hong Kong, Bangkok, Jakarta, and Kuala Lumpur; after the introduction of the 757, its smaller sibling was phased out. In June 1990, Royal Brunei Airlines achieved a historic milestone with a non-stop long-distance flight from Seattle to Mombasa/Nairobi, using Brunei's first twin-engined commercial jet. The 18-hour flight covered 14,856.19 kilometres (7,842 nautical miles) and consumed 74.2 tons of fuel. This achievement, led by local pilot Captain Khalidkhan bin Haji Asmakhan, was a test of the airline's new aircraft for long-haul suitability. Recognised in The Guinness Book of Records in 1992, the accomplishment brought international recognition to Brunei.

=== Rapid expansion: 1992–1997 ===
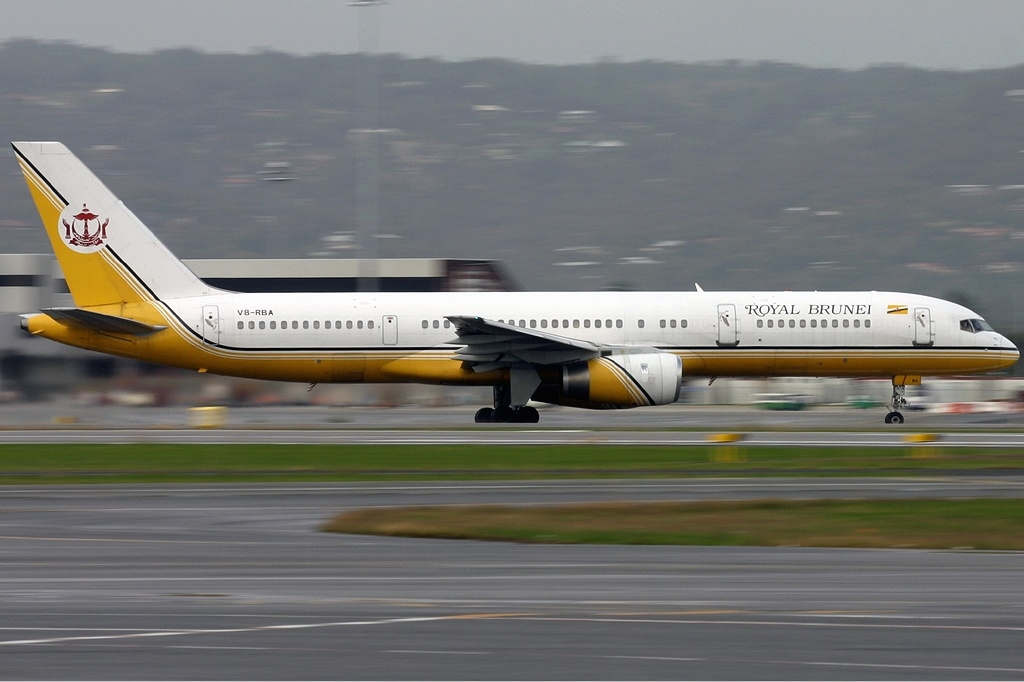
The arrival of Boeing 757-200 commenced the beginning of Royal Brunei's mid- and long-haul expansion.

With the airline's rapid expansion, the 737s were sold, replaced by the Boeing 767. Before that, 757-200s served the airline between Brunei, the Middle East, and Gatwick.

The delivery of the first Boeing 767 (after a leased 767-200 registered CC-CEX) broke a world record when it flew 17 hours and 22 minutes non-stop from Boeing's factory in Seattle to Jomo Kenyatta International Airport, Nairobi, on its way to Brunei. Seven more 767s were delivered, taking the fleet to eight Boeing 767s and two Boeing 757s (one of the 757s was sold to fund the purchase of the new 767s).

In March 1993, Abu Dhabi was added to the route network, through which flights to Frankfurt and Jeddah, were re-routed instead of Dubai. Bali was the second Indonesian city to be added to the network in May of the year. Flights to the third European destination, Zürich, commenced in August 1993 via Kuala Lumpur and another new destination, Bahrain. Before the end of the year, the airline was inaugurating services to Beijing (October) and Cairo (November), via Kuala Lumpur and Bahrain, respectively. Royal Brunei Airlines sold its last Boeing 737 to Aloha Airlines.

The growth of the network continued in 1994. The delivery of two Fokker 50s was used to start services to Miri and Labuan in east Malaysia of the same year. Flights to Brisbane and Osaka were also commenced in June and December, respectively; (the Brisbane service was initially routed via Darwin but later upgraded to a non-stop flight). The desire to link all the major oil and gas cities on Borneo saw the addition of Balikpapan to the route network in December.

Also in 1994, services began to Kolkata via Singapore and then on towards Dubai. Two Dornier 228s were purchased in the same year, and leased to the Malaysian regional carrier, Hornbill Skyways, to connect Brunei by air to Mulu Airport. Services to Cairo and Kolkata (via Singapore) were suspended in mid-1995 due to low passenger numbers.

The F-50s were replaced by the larger and more comfortable Fokker 100 (used, from previous owner Swissair) in 1996, which fuelled expansion to Bintulu. The route to Zürich was suspended in September 1996, to enable Royal Brunei to commence daily services to London Heathrow. Some London flights were routed through Yangon and Abu Dhabi, instead of via Singapore and Dubai; however, Yangon proved uneconomical and was discontinued the following year.

=== Consolidation: 1997–2002 ===
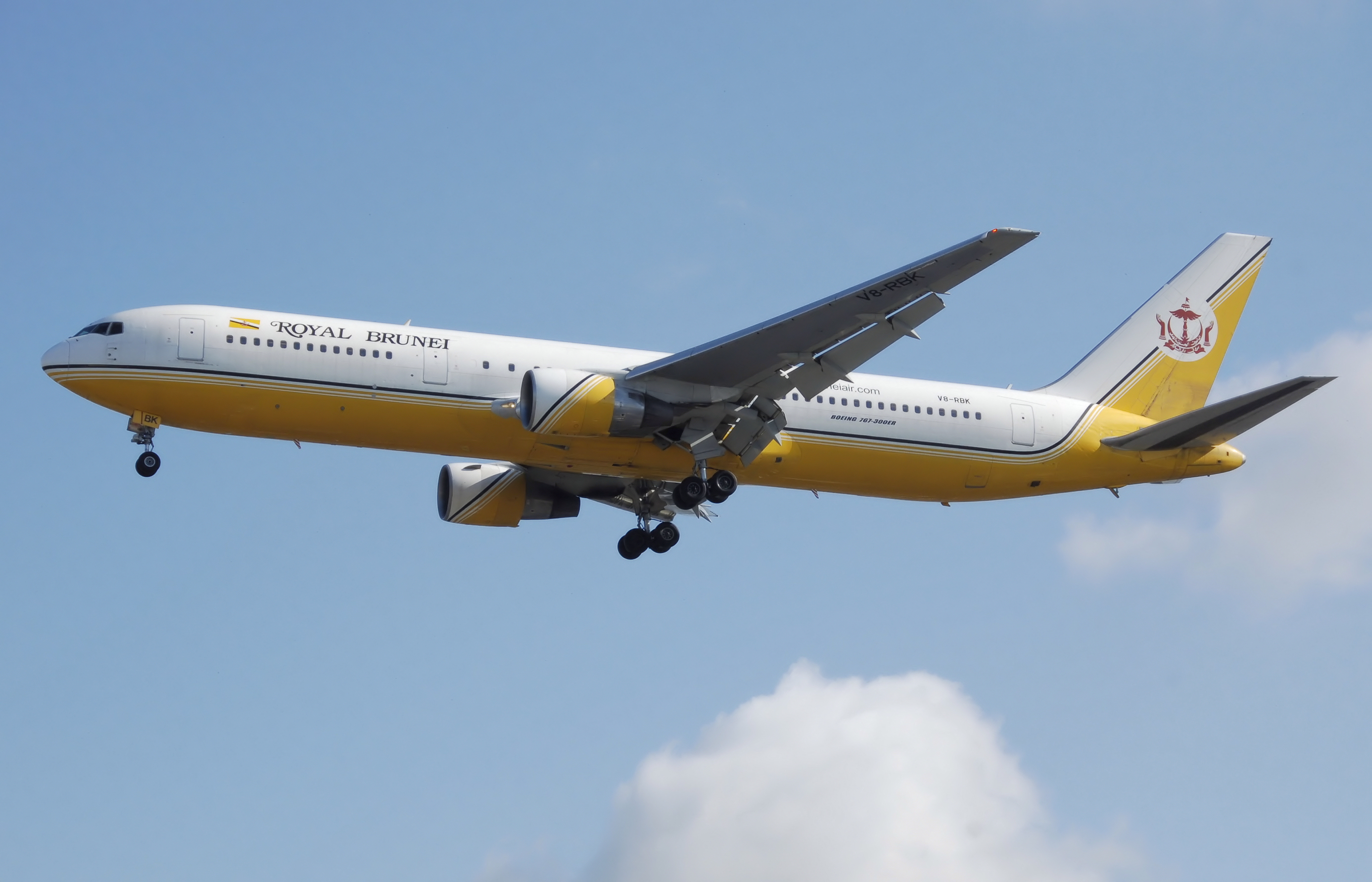
Royal Brunei Airlines Boeing 767-300ER (V8-RBK) landing. This particular aircraft was leased to Vietnam Airlines during the mid- to late-1990s.

On 6 September 1997, Royal Brunei Airlines Flight 839, a Dornier 228 owned by Royal Brunei Airlines, but operated and maintained by Malaysian regional carrier Hornbill Airways, carrying 10 passengers to Miri, crashed into high ground near Miri airport. All eight passengers and two crew died. The remaining Dornier 228s were sold in 1997, and short-haul services connecting Brunei to Miri, Labuan, Mulu, and Bintulu were terminated.

Later that year, Surabaya was the fourth Indonesian destination to be added. Unprofitable routes to Beijing and Osaka were suspended in 1998, and the F-100s were also sold to Alpi Eagles Airlines in 1998. Kuwait was added to the network in 2000, and was served via Singapore, Kolkata, and Dubai. It was suspended a year later. Services also began to Shanghai Pudong International Airport in 2001. Royal Brunei started online booking facilities the same year.

=== Restructuring: 2003–2005 ===
In September 2002, Peter Foster was appointed as chief executive officer (CEO). He began major restructuring in 2003, after years of unprofitable operation. The plan was for Royal Brunei's fleet to grow from nine to twenty-four aircraft in a ten-year period, from 2003 to 2013. The fleet of six Boeing 767s would be changed to fifteen new narrow-body aircraft and eight wide-body aircraft; half of the new aircraft to be leased, and the others to be purchased. The plan also included new services to Auckland, Ho Chi Minh City, Sydney, Seoul, and Tokyo, as well as raising frequencies on other flights.

The deliveries of the new Airbus A319 and A320 in 2002 and 2003, respectively, marked the start of the re-equipping exercise. Two new V2500-powered A319s were delivered on 28 August and 3 September. A320s were added on 21 December 2003 and 3 January 2005. All of the Airbus were leased from CIT Group in a seven-year contract, and are deployed mainly on regional routes. With their introduction, the Boeing 757s were phased out and sold to other parties.

On 31 October 2003, a Royal Brunei Airlines aircraft touched down at Auckland Airport, making it the first destination in New Zealand, and the first new destination added to the network as part of the restructuring exercise. On May the launching of Royal Skies, the airline's frequent-flyer program.

At the end of 2003, Royal Brunei Airlines entered a controversial agreement with Royal Tongan Airlines of Tonga. Under the agreement, Royal Tongan Airlines wet-leased one of the two remaining Boeing 757s. In return, Royal Brunei Airlines was given the opportunity to open up US markets via Tonga. However, before US routes could be planned Royal Tongan Airlines went into bankruptcy with huge debts in mid-2004, after less than six months of operation. As Royal Tongan Airlines was unable to pay the lease fees, the 757 was repossessed and stored.

Starting in March 2004, four of Royal Brunei Airline's Boeing 767s were modified by the introduction of SkyDreamer seats in Business Class, to replace the old First Class and Business Class Skyluxe seats. Business Class was renamed as Sky Executive Class, and in Economy class, each seat was installed with an 8.4 inch television. Sky Executive Class was subsequently renamed Business Class following poor response from the public.

The unprofitable Taipei route was suspended in late 2004. Kuching and Kolkata were dropped on 31 October 2004 due to rising fuel prices, but at the same time, Sydney was added to the route network. Commencing 17 December, flights to Jeddah were routed through Sharjah instead of Abu Dhabi. During the year, the airline launched Blue Sky Fares, a low-cost internet booking facility, offering cheaper economy class fares on selected destinations, to compete with low-cost carriers in the region, such as AirAsia. In August 2005, Peter Foster resigned as CEO to take up a similar post at another airline.

=== Growth: 2006–2011 ===
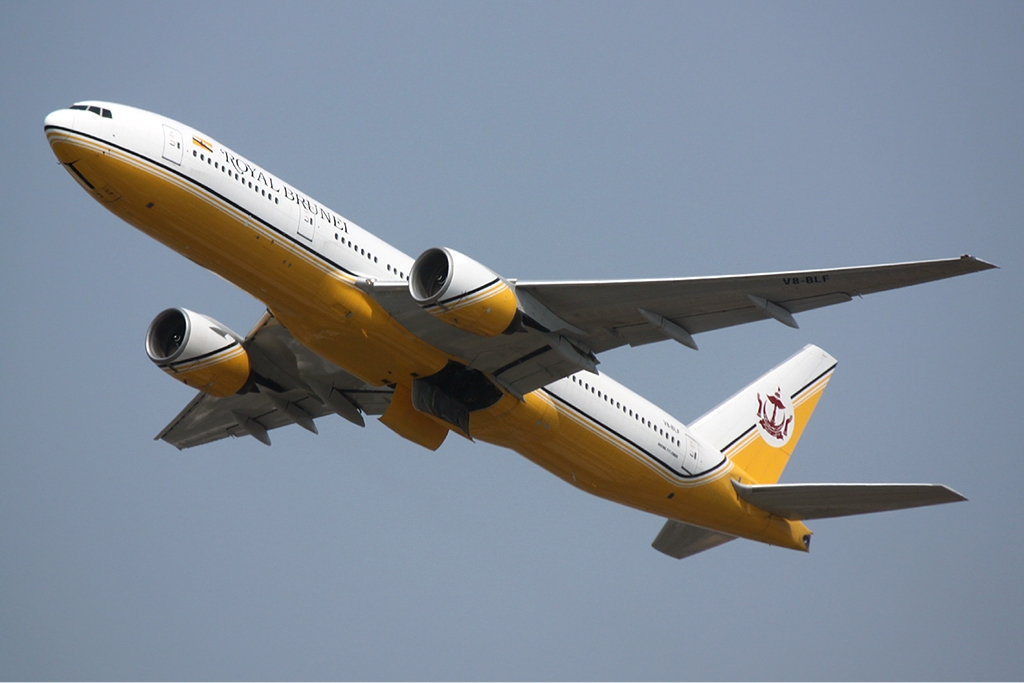
A former Royal Brunei Airlines Boeing 777-200ER in 2012

Royal Brunei Airlines added Ho Chi Minh City to its network list in May 2006, a destination served thrice weekly.

Brunei Darussalam and the United Kingdom (UK) agreed to allow more air services between the countries on 23 November 2007, enhancing the two countries' cooperation in the aviation sector. The agreement came into action with immediate effect. This came off the back of the latest tourism figures of 3,459 European holiday visitor arrivals from January to August 2007.

In early September 2007, Royal Brunei Airlines suspended flights to Frankfurt am Main as part of its latest restructuring exercise. Kuching was reintroduced to the network on 1 December 2007, after a break of three years. Royal Brunei Airlines then suspended services to Darwin on 26 January 2008, after serving the route for 24 years. Sharjah was also dropped from the network early 2008, as Jeddah flights are served non-stop from Bandar Seri Begawan. Shanghai was 'suspended' in April 2008, and Sydney and Bali were dropped from the summer schedule of 2008.

On 2 June 2008, Royal Brunei Airlines increased services to Auckland from Bandar Seri Begawan by offering a new three-weekly direct service. This direct service was in addition to an increase in the frequency of the existing route via Brisbane from three to four times a week. The following year, Robert Yang was appointed as chief executive officer effective from 1 July, after the departure of Ray Sayer.

From 28 March 2010, the service to Shanghai resumed with a frequency of four times per week. Auckland was delinked from Brisbane, making Auckland five times per week, and Brisbane six times per week. From 17 June 2010, Royal Brunei Airlines introduced ex-Singapore Airlines Boeing 777-200ER aircraft to replace the Boeing 767 fleet being returned to their lessors; the inaugural Boeing 777 service was the Bandar Seri Begawan to London Heathrow service via Dubai, on 17 June. The last of the airline's long-serving Boeing 767s were withdrawn from service on 27 September. Plans were also announced during the year for a four times a week Brunei to Melbourne service with the Boeing 777-200ER, starting from 29 March 2011.

On 12 February 2011, Brudirect.com reported that Robert Yang had announced his resignation as the CEO of Royal Brunei Airlines, with effect from 1 March 2011.

=== Stabilisation plan: 2012–present ===
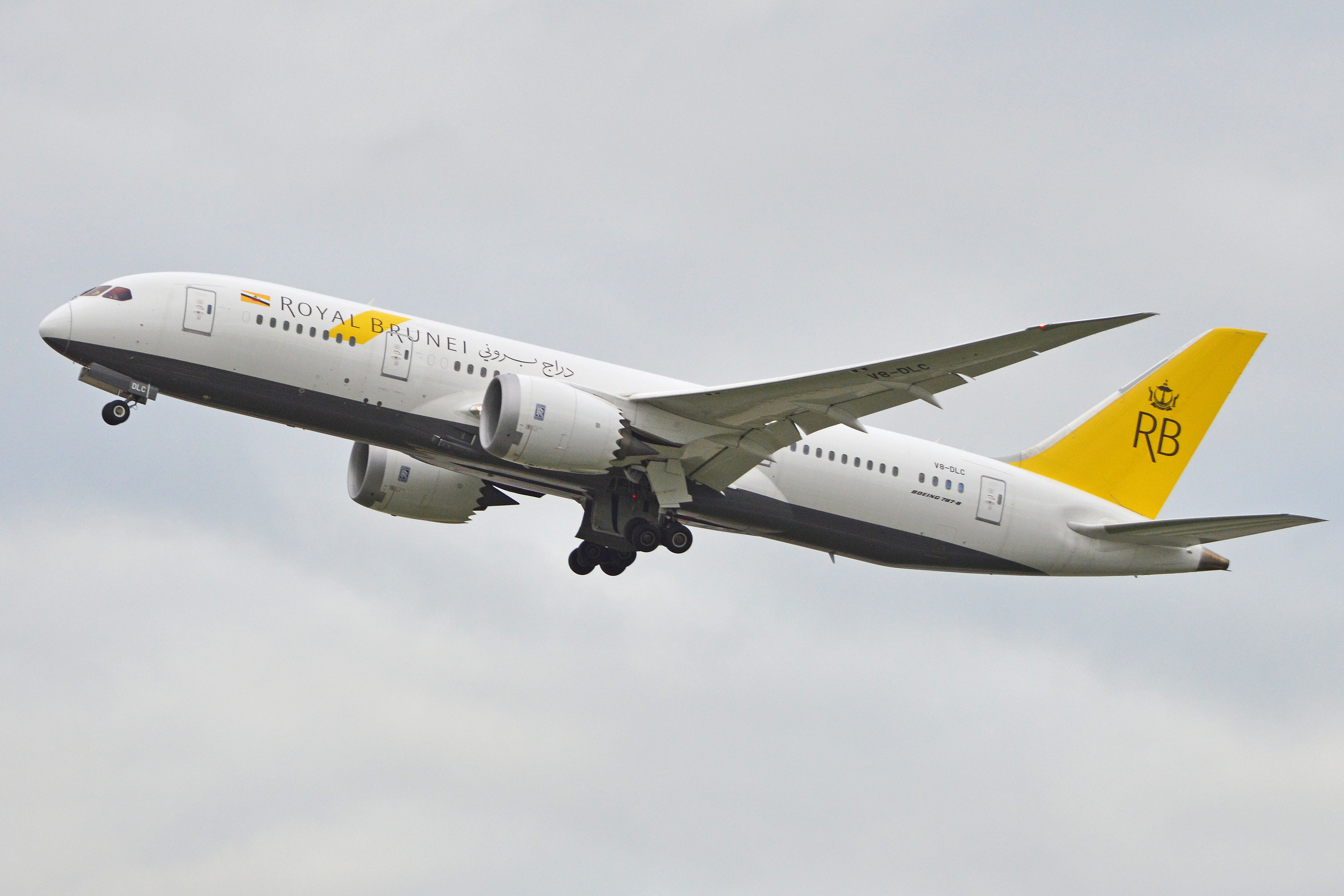
Royal Brunei Boeing 787-8

On 21 June 2012, Royal Brunei Airlines announced that the company was implementing a plan to improve its operations, financial 'performance', and customer service experience, ground operations for all airports. As part of the plan, services to Auckland, Brisbane, Perth, and Ho Chi Minh City were suspended effective after the last scheduled flights of October 2012. Flights to Kuching were suspended after the last scheduled flight of July 2012. The airline leased two additional Airbus A320s in 2013, together with five Boeing 787s, to strengthen and revitalise its regional network, and international routes respectively. The first of the five Boeing 787s, with registration number V8-DLA, was delivered on 4 October 2013. All of its Boeing 787 aircraft are powered by the Rolls-Royce Trent 1000 engines. On 18 October 2013, the Bandar Seri Begawan to Singapore service was used as the 787's inaugural flight. Flights to London Heathrow via Dubai using the 787s started on 2 December 2013.

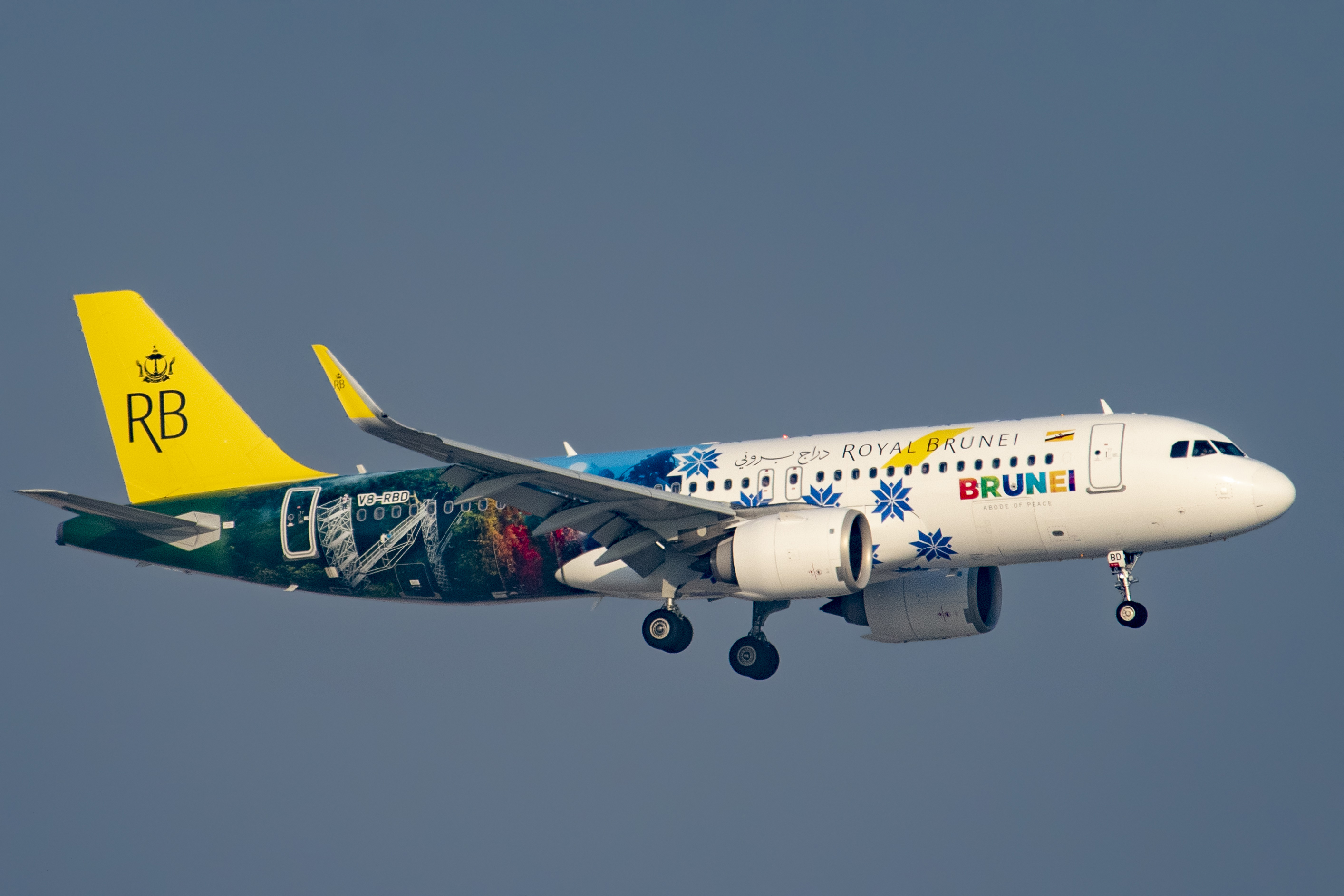
A Royal Brunei Airbus A320neo in the Brunei Tourism livery

On 6 November 2013, Royal Brunei Airlines outlined plans to offer a '100% Dreamliner service' on all of its long-haul routes. The airline at that time considered southern India for its next airline expansion. RB, which operated four Airbus A320s and two Airbus A319s as of November 2013, also planned to expand its short-haul aircraft fleet to 'double digits'. The airline looked at plans to purchase current-generation Boeing 737s or Airbus A320s. These short-haul aircraft might also be used on flights to Australia, as part of its future expansion plan. RB resumed flights to Bali four times a week, starting July 2014. Effective 17 October 2014, RB resumed flights to Ho Chi Minh City four times a week, as it looked to use the destination to connect with key regional and international markets.

The airline leased two new Airbus A320 aircraft which were delivered in September and November 2015, eventually to replace the two Airbus A319 aircraft. This indicated the start of the programme to modernise the narrow-body fleet, with up to ten Airbus A320s to be delivered from the end of 2017. RB's first A320-neo was delivered on the 28 May 2018.

In 2018, Royal Brunei founded a regional subsidiary RB Link in partnership with Malindo Air. Flights commenced in 2019 with 2 ATR 72 aircraft operated by Malindo Air. It was reintegrated into Royal Brunei Airlines in 2020.

The CEO from 2011 to March 2016 was Dermot Mannion. In March 2016, Dermot Mannion finished his five-year term and was replaced by Karam Chand. On 6 January 2021, Captain Haji Khalidkhan Haji Asmakhan was appointed as the Chief Executive Officer for Royal Brunei Airlines and retired the position on 10 October 2021. On 1 November 2022, Captain Sabirin Hj Abd Hamid was appointed as the current Chief Executive Officer for Royal Brunei Airlines. Prior to the appointment he was the Acting CEO for 13 months and the Chief Operation Officer since 6 January 2021.

== Awards and accolades ==
In 2023, RB was awarded a Five Star rating for the Major Airline category by the Airline Passenger Experience Association (APEX). In the same year, RB was awarded World's Leading Cabin Crew for the fourth consecutive year by WTA. On 30 May 2024, RB received Muslim-Friendly Airline of The Year from Crescent Rating for Halal in Travel Awards.

== Destinations ==
=== Codeshare and interline agreements ===
Royal Brunei Airlines has codeshare agreements and interline agreements with the following airlines:

- Air France
- Air India
- All Nippon Airways
- Asiana Airlines
- Bangkok Airways
- British Airways
- Cathay Pacific
- China Airlines
- China Eastern Airlines
- Emirates
- Ethiopian Airlines
- Flydubai
- Garuda Indonesia
- Gulf Air
- Hong Kong Airlines
- Japan Airlines
- KLM
- Korean Air
- Malaysia Airlines
- MASwings
- Myanmar Airways International
- Philippine Airlines
- Qantas
- Qatar Airways
- Saudia
- Singapore Airlines
- Thai Airways International
- Turkish Airlines
- Vietnam Airlines
- Virgin Australia

== Fleet ==
=== Current fleet ===
As of August 2025, Royal Brunei Airlines operates the following aircraft:

Royal Brunei Airlines fleet
Aircraft	In service	Orders	Passengers				Notes
Aircraft	In service	Orders	C	Y+	Y	Total	Notes
Airbus A320neo	7	—	12	18	120	150	
Boeing 787-8	5	—	18	52	184	254	
Boeing 787-9	—	4	TBA				Deliveries expected to begin in second half of 2028
Total	12	4					

=== Special liveries ===
- Royal Brunei Airlines' first special livery was revealed around July–August 1999, in conjunction with the 20th Southeast Asian Games, hosted in Brunei. The livery was installed on one of RBA's Boeing 767-300ER (registration V8-RBK).
- One of Royal Brunei Airlines' Boeing 787-8 (registration V8-DLD) has a special 40th anniversary sticker behind the rear doors on both sides of the aircraft. This sticker was added to the body of the aircraft in late 2014 to mark 40 years of operations. 50th anniversary decals were added to the airline's fleet in 2024.
- In October 2017, on their official Instagram account, it was revealed that one of their Airbus A320 (registration V8-RBX) has a special 50th Golden Jubilee livery for His Majesty the 29th Sultan of Brunei's accession to the throne.
- One of Royal Brunei Airlines' Airbus A320neo (registration V8-RBD) has a new special livery related to Brunei tourism, which was revealed in an official launch event for the aircraft's new fleet in September 2018.

== Services ==
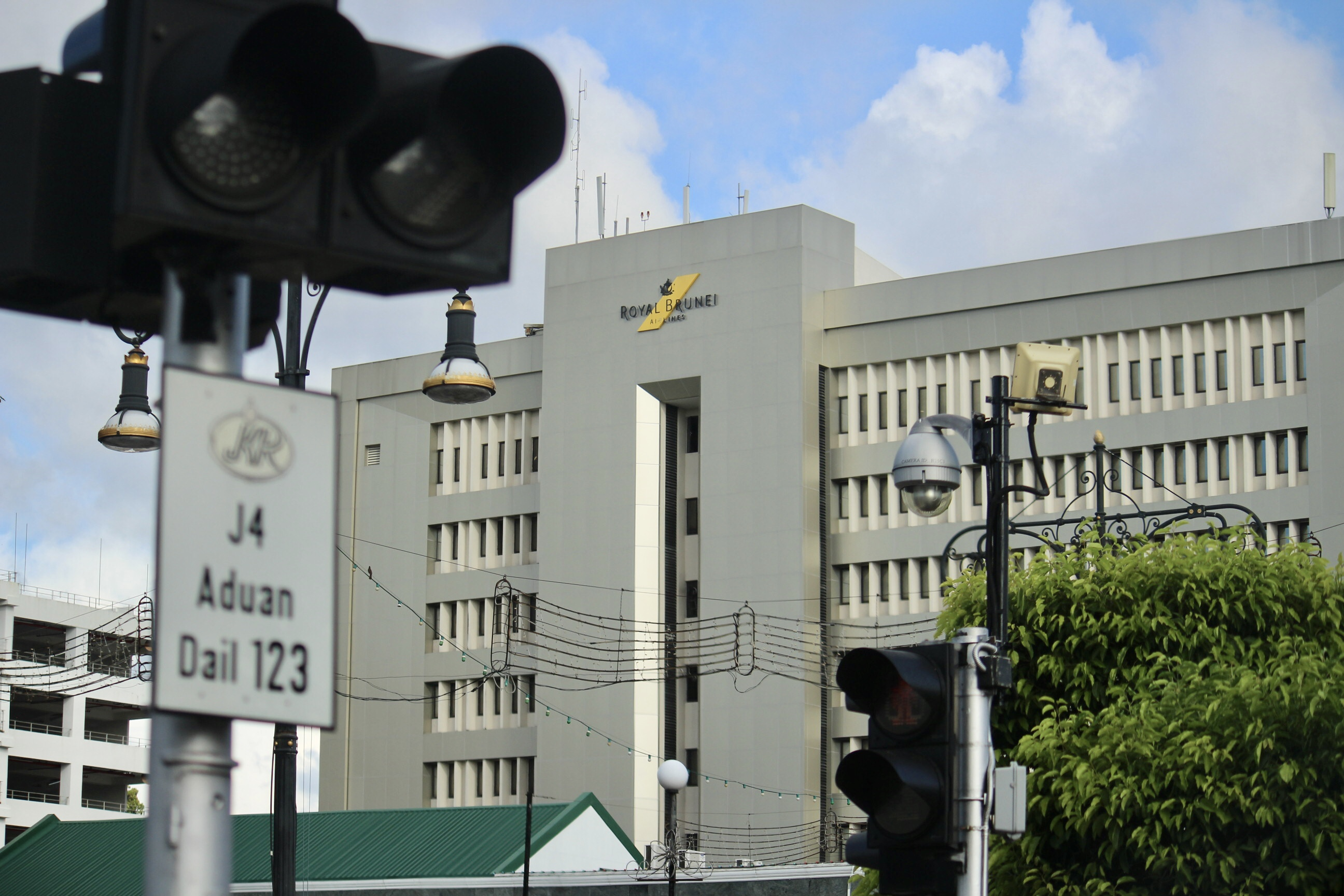
Royal Brunei Airlines plaza, Bandar Seri Begawan

=== Airport lounge ===
SkyLounge is Royal Brunei Airlines' lounge at the Brunei International Airport, which was opened in January 2004, and occupies the entire mezzanine floor at the departure hall (airside) of the airport. The lounge is exclusively reserved for Royal Brunei's business and economy class passengers (with Priority Pass), and Royal Skies Gold and Silver members. The lounge may also be used by qualifying members of other airlines, with an agreement with Royal Brunei Airlines to use the lounge, such as Singapore Airlines.

=== In-flight service ===
Royal Brunei does not serve alcoholic beverages on board its flights. Non-Muslim passengers are however, permitted to bring along their own alcohol for consumption on board. This reflects the Bruneian government's policy on the sale and importation of alcohol in Brunei. All inflight meals served are halal.

=== Cabins ===
The Boeing 787-8 Business Class seats can be made into a fully flat bed. Each seat is also offered with a 15.4 inches (390 millimetres), duo function in-seat personal television (touch screen and remote-controlled capability), along with an in-seat power outlet. The Economy Class seats can be reclined 6 inches (150 millimetres) from the upright position. At each seat is a 9 inches (230 millimetres), touch screen in-seat personal television with USB charging capability, along with an in-seat power outlet.

The two new Airbus A320s, V8-RBW and V8-RBX, have three rows of seats with extra legroom compared to ordinary economy class seats. The seats are situated immediately behind the business class seats. The area can be separated from the rest of the ordinary economy class seats and the business class seats with curtains. On flights to and from Brunei, Singapore, Kuala Lumpur, and Hong Kong, it is possible to pay in advance to sit in these seats via the 'Manage my booking' section of the airline's website. As well as extra legroom, meals are served first, and there is priority boarding. This cabin is exactly the same as Royal Brunei's Airbus A320neo, but with a personal, touch screen IFE (in-flight entertainment) system with a USB charging capability, along with an in-seat power outlet in each seat.

=== Loyalty programme ===
Royal Skies is the loyalty programme of Royal Brunei Airlines, consisting of three tiers. Launched in May 2003, members will earn actual miles on every eligible Royal Brunei Airlines' flight, or by utilising the products and / or services of Royal Skies partners.

The Blue card does not carry any expiry date, however, Silver and Gold cards will have an expiry date that shows the end of the benefits period. Silver and Gold members must re-qualify for the Elite tier to continue receiving Elite Status benefits. With the expiration of Elite status benefits, the member will use their Blue card to start earning tier-qualifying miles again. Miles expire after three years.

Miles accrued by Royal Skies members can be redeemed for free flights or seat upgrades. A free upgrade award starts from 5,000 Royal Skies miles, while redemption for a free flight starts from 15,000 miles.

== Senior leadership ==
- Chairman: Haji Muhammad Juanda bin Haji Abdul Rashid (since 18 January 2023)
- Deputy Chairman: Riza bin Haji Mohd. Yunos
- CEO: Sabirin bin Haji Abdul Hamid (since 1 November 2022)

=== List of former chairmen ===
- Ahmad Wally Skinner (1992–1998)
- Haji Mohammad Alimin bin Haji Abdul Wahab (1998–2001)
- Haji Hazair bin Haji Abdullah (2003–2005)
- Pengiran Haji Abdul Hamid bin Pengiran Haji Mohammad Yassin (2005–2007)
- Pengiran Haji Abu Bakar bin Pengiran Haji Ismail (2007–2008)
- Lim Jock Seng (2008–2010)
- Haji Bahrin bin Abdullah (2010–2018)
- Haji Mohd. Amin Liew bin Abdullah (2018–2021)
- Haji Abdul Manaf bin Haji Metussin (2021–2023)

=== List of former CEOs ===
- Peter Foster (2002–2005)
- Ray Sayer (2007–2009)
- Robert Yang (2009–2011)
- Dermot Mannion (2011–2016)
- Karam Chand (2016–2021)
- Haji Khalidkhan bin Haji Asmakhan (2021)

== See also ==
- List of companies of Brunei
