= Brunei International Airport =

Sole international airport serving Brunei

Brunei International Airport لاڤڠن تربڠ انتارابڠسا بروني
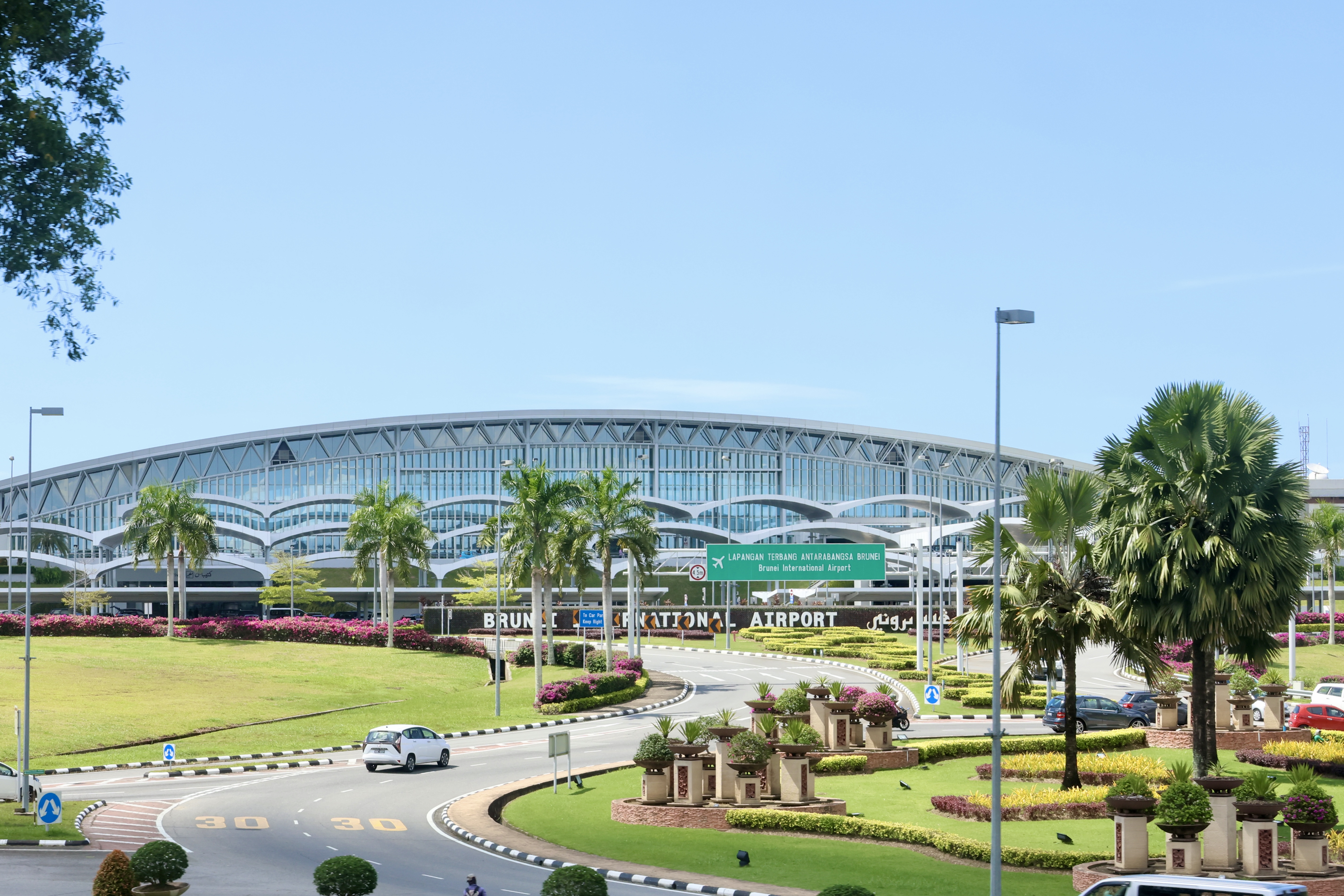
- IATA: BWN; ICAO: WBSB

Summary
- Airport type: Public
- Owner: Government of Brunei / Royal Brunei Air Force
- Operator: Department of Civil Aviation (Brunei)
- Serves: Brunei
- Location: Bandar Seri Begawan, Brunei-Muara District, Brunei
- Opened: 1974; 52 years ago
- Hub for: Royal Brunei Airlines
- Built: 1970; 56 years ago
- Time zone: Brunei Time (BNT) (UTC+08:00)
- Elevation AMSL: 22 m (72 ft)
- Coordinates: 04°56′43″N 114°56′01″E
- Website: Brunei Int'l Airport (archived)

Maps
- Brunei-Muara District in Brunei

- Location in Brunei BWN / WBSB (Borneo) BWN / WBSB (Southeast Asia) BWN / WBSB (Asia)

Runways
| Direction | Length | | Surface |
| Direction | m | ft | Surface |
|---|---|---|---|
| 03/21 | 3,685 | 12,090 | Asphalt |
- Source: DAFIF

Brunei International Airport (BIA) (Malay: Lapangan Terbang Antarabangsa Brunei, Jawi: لاڤڠن تربڠ انتارابڠسا بروني ) (IATA: BWN, ICAO: WBSB) is the only international airport serving Brunei, on the island of Borneo.

Located near Bandar Seri Begawan, the capital of Brunei, it serves as the home base and hub for Royal Brunei Airlines. Additionally, the airport shares its facility with Royal Brunei Air Force Base, Rimba owned by the Royal Brunei Air Force. Brunei International Airport serves international destinations across Asia and Oceania, as well as flights to the Middle East and London Heathrow. It is one of the only two airports in the country, the other one being Anduki Airfield, which now primarily serves as a heliport.

== History ==
=== Foundation and early years ===
Commercial air transport in Brunei began in 1953, with the establishment of air service links connecting Brunei Town (present-day Bandar Seri Begawan and capital city of Brunei) with Anduki (near the oil town of Seria) in the Belait District. Initial flights linking Brunei to British Malaya, North Borneo, Sarawak, Singapore, and overseas destinations were primarily provided by Borneo Airways and Malayan Airways. Airport services were operated from the Berakas area at an old runway site built by the Japanese during World War II. It was known then as Brunei Airport.

The growth in popularity of air travel in the 1970s resulted in a significant increase in civil aviation. Suddenly, the old airport at Berakas was swamped with activity, operating beyond its capacity. This situation prompted the government to scout for a new site to build a modern international airport. The construction of a new airport began in 1970; 56 years ago, in Mukim Berakas in the Brunei-Muara District, because this location was easily accessible from all areas of the country. The airport became operational in 1974, and its runway was one of the longest runways in the Far East.

In tandem with these developments, Royal Brunei Airlines, initially known as Royal Brunei, took flight on 14 May 1975; 51 years ago, utilising the newly constructed Brunei International Airport as its hub. Founded on 18 November 1974, the airline marked its inception as a significant milestone in the burgeoning era of Brunei's aviation history.

=== Development since the 2000s ===
In 2008, it was announced that a study to review necessary expansions and modifications was completed, and a masterplan was written up soon after. The masterplan consisted of different phases, and Phase 1, which included upgrading the existing air-conditioned passenger terminal building and the cargo terminal, was targeted to be completed by end of 2013.

Phase 1A was already completed on 1 October 2013, with the opening of the new arrival hall. The capacity of the airport was to be increased to three million passengers by end of 2014. After Phase 1 was completed, Phase 2 was planned be initiated in 2022; this included the construction of a new terminal, which will be able to accommodate up to eight million passengers. Currently, the runway is being upgraded to allow bigger aircraft such as Airbus A380 and Boeing 747 to operate more easily.

== Facilities ==
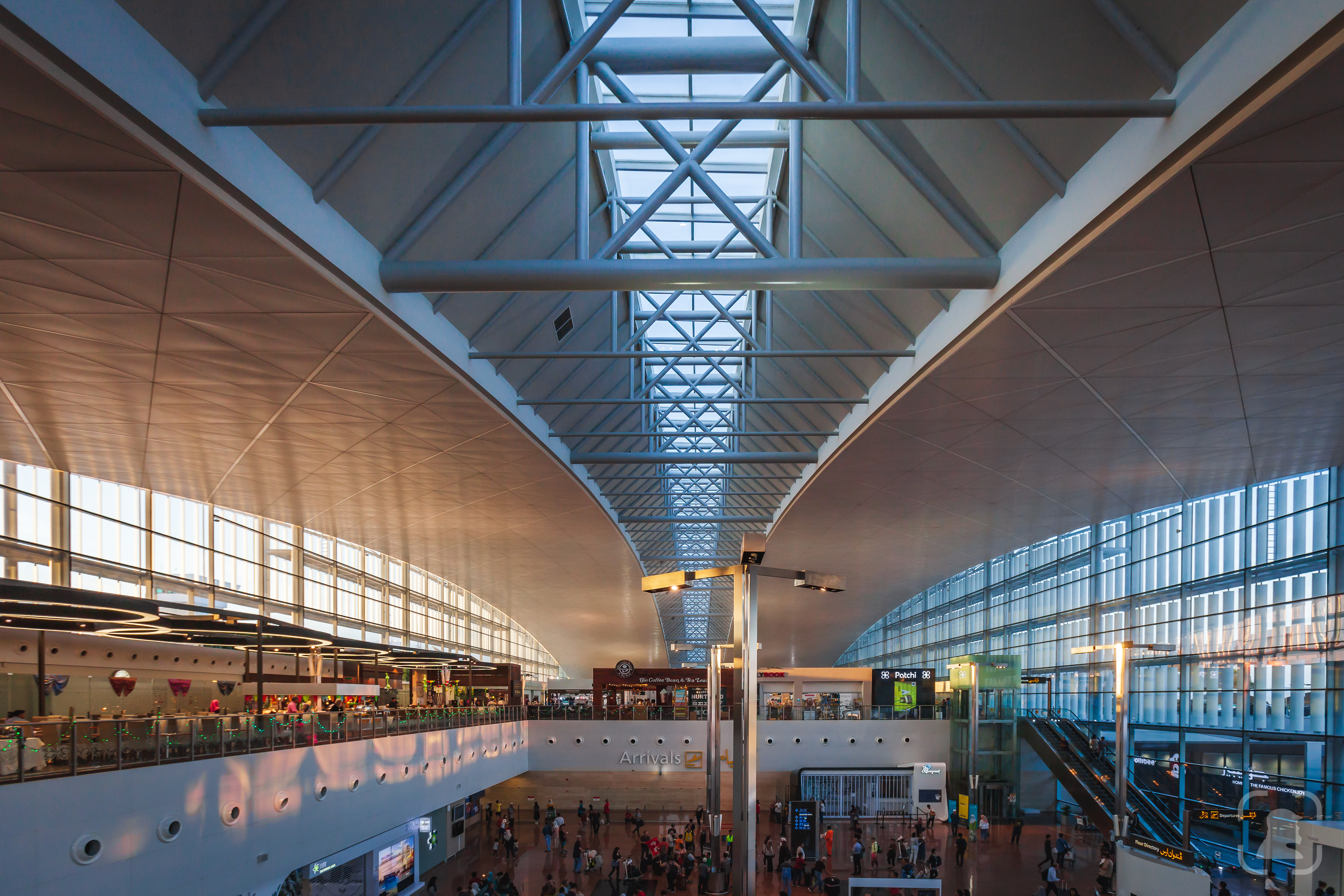
Inside the main terminal

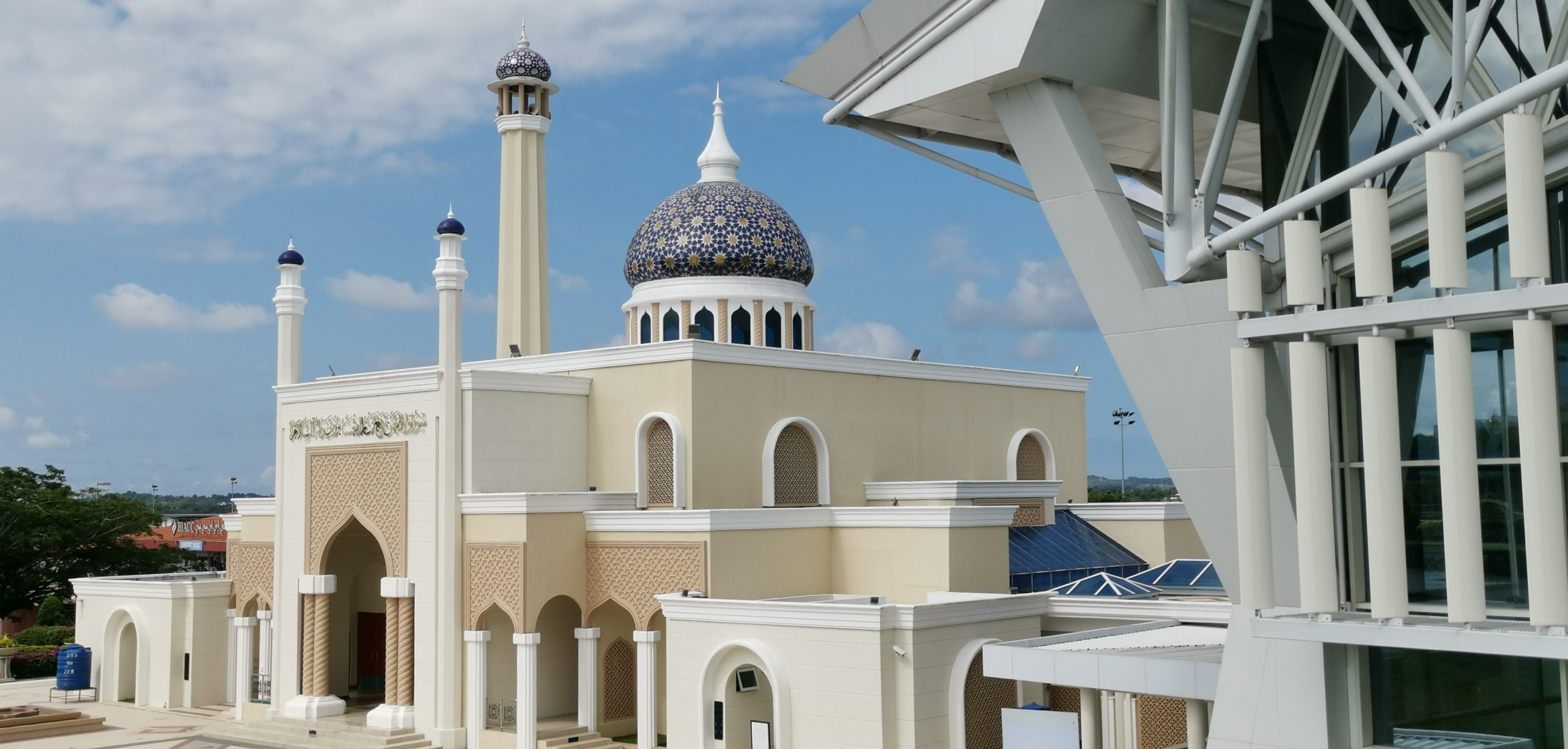
Brunei International Airport Mosque, located within the terminal compound

=== Capacity ===
Brunei International Airport consists of an international terminal which can handle up to three million passengers, a cargo terminal with a capacity of 50,000 tonnes (55,116 tons) of cargo, and a royal terminal where the sultan's flights are based. In 2005, Brunei International Airport handled 1.3 million passengers.

=== Terminal ===
Inside the international terminal, there are 40 check-in counters, 12 emigration counters, and 14 immigration clearance counters. Businesses inside the terminal include Burger King and KFC international fast-food outlets, Jollibee regional fast food, plus local 'concept stores' which include food, tea and coffee drinks, and jewellery stores, along with Avis car rental desk. It also includes a VIP Lounge for business travellers. Brunei International Airport has car parking space for 1,440 cars, with a further 300 covered parking spaces. Other facilities at BIA include a post office, bank, the Department of Civil Aviation (Brunei) (located within the air traffic control tower building), and the Brunei International Airport Mosque.

== Airlines and destinations ==
The following airlines operate regular scheduled services at Brunei International Airport:

| Airlines | Destinations |
|---|---|
| AirAsia | Kuala Lumpur |
| Cebu Pacific | Manila |
| Indonesia AirAsia | Jakarta–Soekarno-Hatta |
| Royal Brunei Airlines | Balikpapan, Bangkok–Suvarnabhumi, Beijing–Daxing, Chennai, Dubai–International, Hangzhou, Ho Chi Minh City, Hong Kong, Jakarta–Soekarno-Hatta, Kota Kinabalu, Kuala Lumpur–International, Kuching, London–Heathrow, Manila, Melbourne, Nanning, Seoul–Incheon, Singapore, Surabaya, Taipei–Taoyuan, Tokyo–Narita; Seasonal: Jeddah, London–Gatwick |
| Shenzhen Airlines | Charter: Shenzhen |
| Singapore Airlines | Singapore |

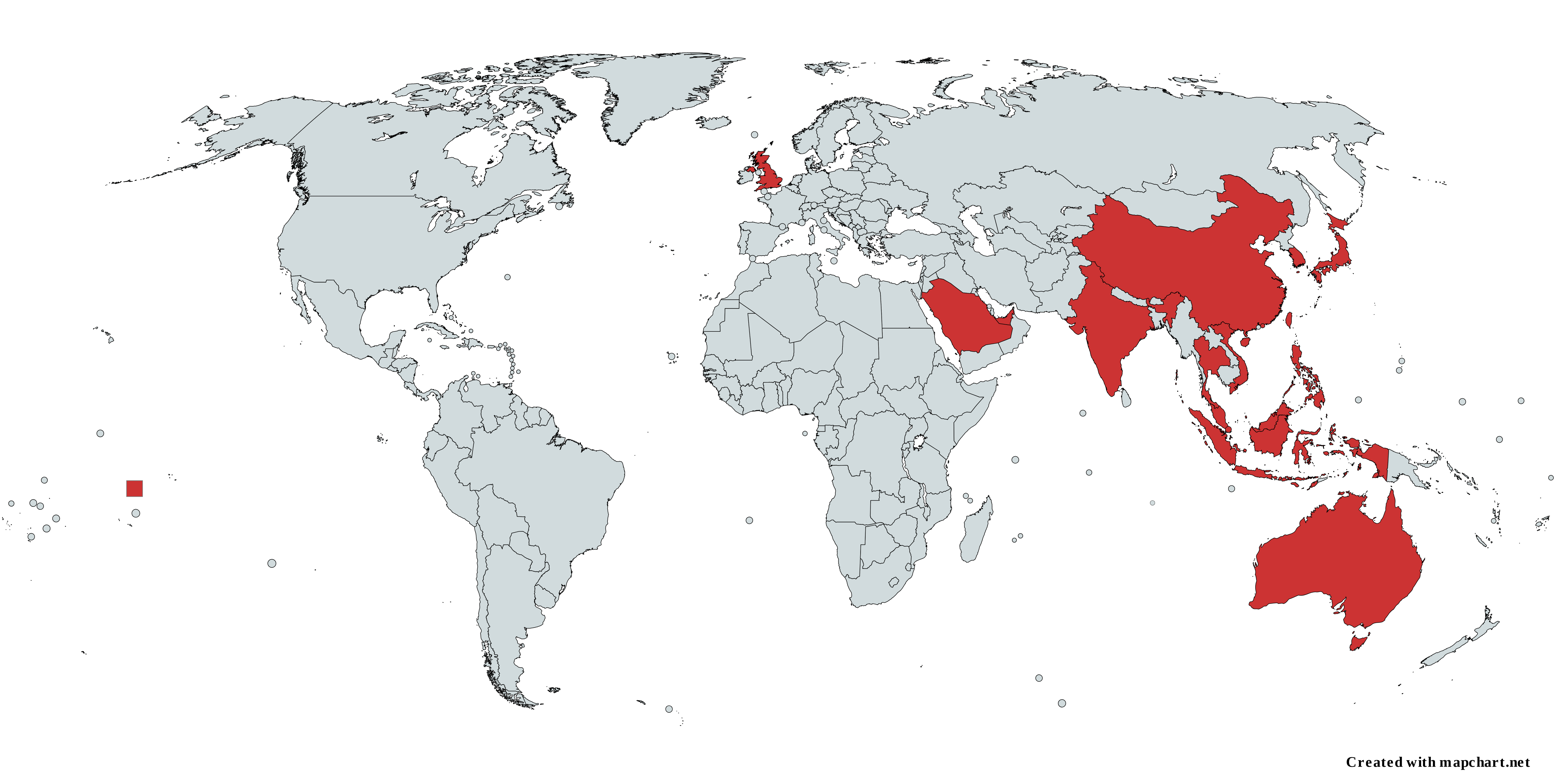
As of March 2026.

== Ground transport ==
Brunei International Airport is located approximately 8km from the centre of the capital. Along with personal car rental options, there are regular taxi services to and from the airport, with a journey time of approximately 15 minutes. There are also regular public bus services which go around the capital, taking approximately 30 minutes.

== See also ==
- List of airports in Brunei
- Transport in Brunei
