= List of defunct airlines of Malaysia =

This is a list of defunct airlines of Malaysia, including British Borneo.

Airline	Image	IATA	ICAO	Callsign	Founded	Ceased operations	Notes
Adorna Airways					1997	1997	
Aero Malaysiana					2001	2002	Never launched,with two undelivered ATR 72-200 aircraft already painted in its livery
Amrose Air					2007	2007	
Asean Airlines					2003	2003	Never launched
AsiaCargo Express		3G	CXM	ASIA CARGO	2015	2020	Rebranded as World Cargo Airlines
Asia Pacific Airlines		JA	MLP	MALAY PACIFIC	1993	1998	
Athena Air Services					2003	2006	
Awan Inspirasi					2006	2016	
Borneo Airways Limited		AB			1957	1965	Integrated into Malaysian Airways
Eaglexpress		9A	EZX	EAGLEXPRESS AIR	2012	2016	
Federation Air Service		FS	FAS		1951	1960	Integrated into Malaysian Airways
Fly Asian Xpress		D7	XFA	FAX AIR	2006	2007	Rebranded as AirAsia X
Flying Fox Airways					2013	2014	Rebranded as YOU Wings
flyGlobal		FS	FGG	BLUEFINCH	2016	2019	License revoked
flymojo				MOJO	2015	2016	Failed project
Gading Sari Aviation Services		3G	GSB	GADING SARI	1996	2015	Renamed to AsiaCargo Express
Heritage Air					2010	2011	
Kargo Xpress		WW	KXP	XPRESS KARGO	2021	2024	Rebranded as MJets Air
Ked-Air					2004	2006	
Love2Fly		WW	LUV	LOVE JET	2017	2020	Never launched
Mafira Air		3A			1997	2000	
Malaysia Air Charter		DP			1962	1986	Placed into receivership
Malayan Airways					1947	1963	Renamed to Malaysian Airways
Malaysian Airline System		MH	MAS	MALAYSIAN	1972	1987	Renamed to Malaysia Airlines
Malaysian Airways		ML			1963	1966	Renamed to Malaysia–Singapore Airlines
Malaysia–Singapore Airlines		ML	MSA	MALAYSIAN	1966	1972	Split into Malaysian Airline System and Singapore Airlines
Malindo Air	Malindo_Air,_9M-LNG,_Boeing_737-9GP_ER_(32718998617)	OD	MXD		2013	2022	Rebranded as Batik Air Malaysia
MASwings		MY	MWG	MASWINGS	2007	2026	Rebranded as AirBorneo
Melaka Air					2010	2012	
Merpati Intan			BOR	BORNEO	1996	1997	Rebranded as Borneo Airways
Metro Air					2002	2003	Never launched
Mofaz Air			MFZ	MOFAZ AIR	1991	1999	
MYAirline		Z9	MYM	MYAIR	2021	2023	Collapsed from financial troubles,fleet given to its lessors and AirAsia
My Jet XPress Airline		N7	NEP	WARISAN	2009	2024	
Neptune Air		N7	NEP		2009	2018	Rebranded as My Jet Xpress Airlines
Pelandok Airways		BL			1972	1972	Pioneered low-cost travel in Malaysian aviation
Pelangi Air		9P	PEG	PELANGI AIRWAYS	1987	2001	Collapse from financial problems,high costs and regulatory action
Rayani Air		RN	RKT	BLUE GREEN	2015	2016	Licence revoked
Saeaga Airlines		S5	SGG	SAEAGA	1995	1998	
Scanda Sky					2019	2019	No license
Silverfly		SF	SFI	SILVERFLY	2009	2010	
SKS Airways		KI	SJB	SOUTHERN TIGER	2017	2025	
Southern Cross Airways		EX		SOUTHERN CROSS	1971	1972	Airline collapsed,10th January 1972 court case with its fuel supplier ESSO over unpaid fuel dispute
Suasa Airlines		R9	SSB	SUASA AIR	2015	2017	No valid commercial license from MAVCOM
Tiram Air					1994	1999	Owned by Government of Johor
Transmile Air Services		TH	TSE	TRANSMILE	1993	2014	Rebranded as Raya Airways
Usadasil Air					1988	1994	
Vision Air Malaysia					2001	2003	Merged into Hornbill Skyways
Wirakris Udara			WKU		1992	1995	
YOU Wings					2014	2020	

== See also ==
- List of airlines of Malaysia
- List of airports in Malaysia
