= List of airlines of Malaysia =

This is a list of airlines in Malaysia. The airlines are sorted alphabetically by activeness and type.

== Scheduled airlines ==
Airline	Image	IATA	ICAO	Callsign	Commenced operations	Hub airport(s)
AirAsia		AK	AXM	RED CAP	1996	Kuala Lumpur International Airport; Penang International Airport; Senai International Airport; Kota Kinabalu International Airport; Kuching International Airport
AirAsia X		D7	XAX	XANADU	2007	Kuala Lumpur International Airport
AirBorneo		MY	MWG	MASWINGS	2026	Kota Kinabalu International Airport; Kuching International Airport; Miri Airport
Batik Air Malaysia	9M-LRF_-_Boeing_737-8_MAX_-_Batik_Air_Malaysia_-_42994_-_VGHS	OD	MXD	MALINDO	2013	Kuala Lumpur International Airport
Firefly		FY	FFM	FIREFLY	2007	Penang International Airport; Sultan Abdul Aziz Shah Airport
Malaysia Airlines		MH	MAS	MALAYSIAN	1947	Kuala Lumpur International Airport

== Charter Airlines ==
Airline	Image	IATA	ICAO	Callsign	Commenced operations
Ascend Airways Malaysia		AU	AYG	ASTRA	2024
Berjaya Air		J8	BVT	BERJAYA	1989
Hornbill Skyways					1977
Layang Layang Aerospace			LAY	LAYANG	1994
MHS Aviation	Sikorsky_S-76C_MHS_Aviation_9M-STB,_LUX_Luxembourg_(Findel),_Luxembourg_PP1237823094				1983
Pan-Malaysian Air Transport			PMA		1965
Prima Air			HGM	MAHSURI	2015
Sabah Air		SA	SAX	SABAH AIR	1975
Weststar Aviation					2003

== Cargo airlines ==
Airline	Image	IATA	ICAO	Callsign	Commenced operations
MJets Air		WW	KXP	XPRESS KARGO	2024
MASkargo		MH	MAS	MALAYSIAN CARGO	1972
Raya Airways		TH	RMY	RAYA EXPRESS	1993
World Cargo Airlines		3G	WCM	WORLD CARGO	1996

== See also ==
- List of defunct airlines of Malaysia
- List of all airlines
- List of airports in Malaysia
- List of defunct airlines of Asia
