= Berjaya (disambiguation) =

Berjaya is a former political party based in Sabah, Malaysia.

Berjaya may also refer to:

- Berjaya Air, an airline based in Malaysia
- Berjaya Group, a Malaysian-based company
