= Malaysia Air Charter =

Malaysian airline (1962–1986)

Malaysia Air Charter Company Sdn Bhd
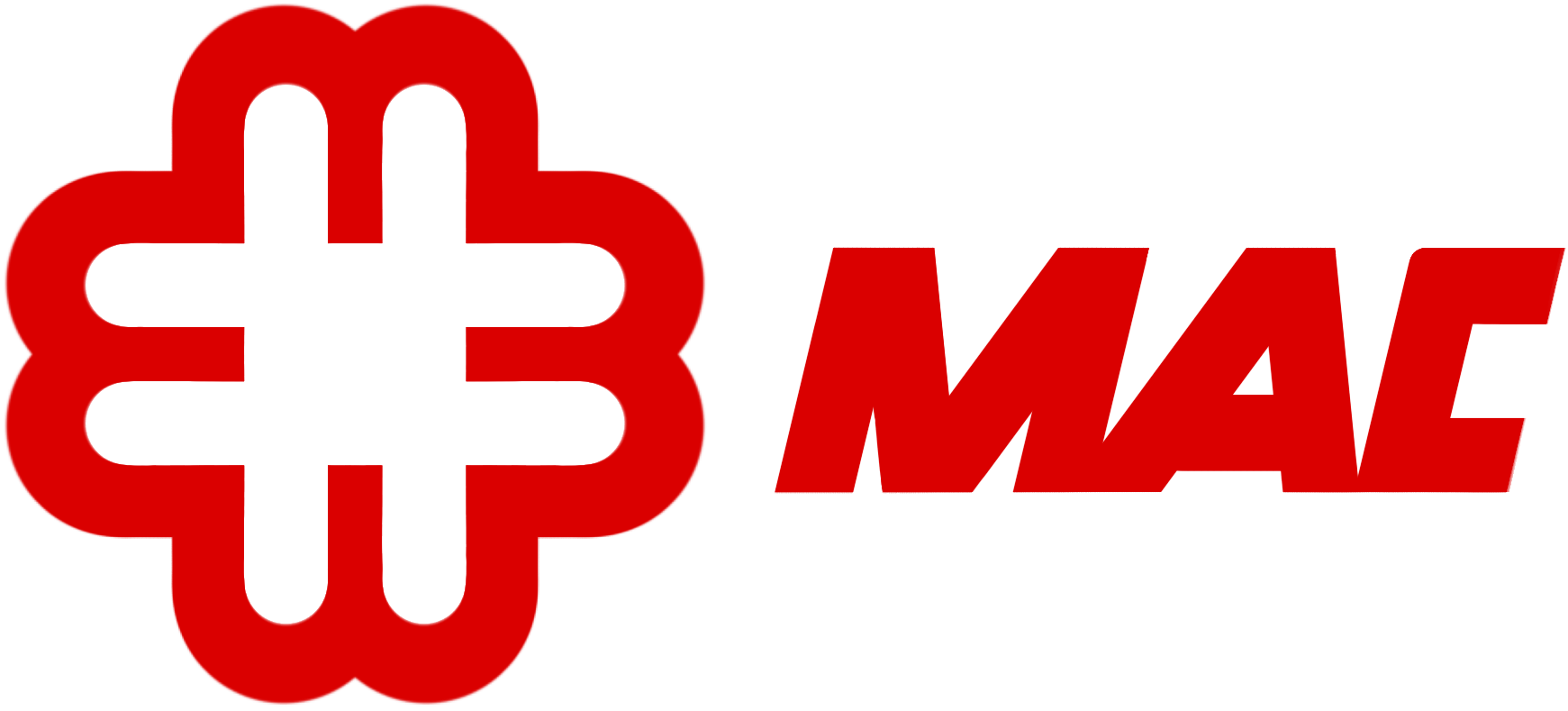

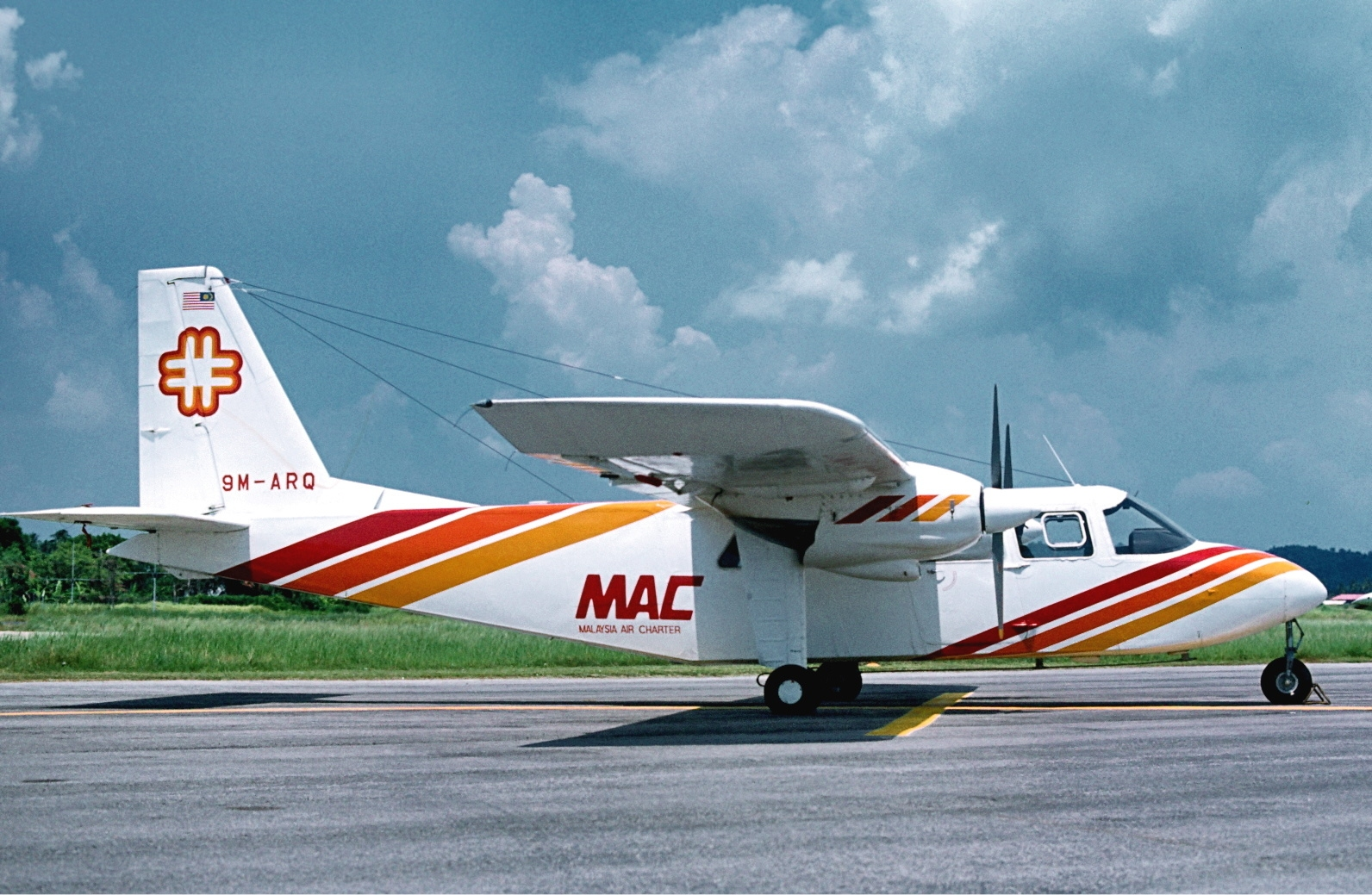
- Malaysia Air Charter Britten-Norman BN-2 Islander
IATA	ICAO	Call sign
MB (1970s) DP (1980s)	MCC	MACAIR
- Founded: 13 February 1962; 64 years ago
- Commenced operations: 14 May 1962; 64 years ago
- Ceased operations: 11 September 1986; 40 years ago
- Hubs: Kuala Lumpur-Subang
- Focus cities: Kerteh
- Subsidiaries: Macair Tours; Malaysia Air Training
- Fleet size: 11
- Destinations: 12
- Parent company: Borneo Company (1960s-1967) Inchcape plc (1967-1975) Bank Bumiputra Berhad (1975-1986)
- Headquarters: Subang
- Key people: Tuan Haji Shamsuddin bin Haji Ahmad (chairman); Tuan Haji Abdul Wahab bin Abdul Majid (CEO)
- Founder: Jan Bussell
- Employees: 210

Malaysia Air Charter (abbreviated as MAC and also referred to as MACAir) was a regional airline based in Subang, Malaysia. It operated domestic flights in the Malay Peninsula. The Malaysian newspaper The Straits Times describes as the "Malaysia's first private airline".

The airline was placed into receivership and filed for bankruptcy, ending its operation in September 1986.

== History ==
=== Beginning of operations (1962-1975) ===
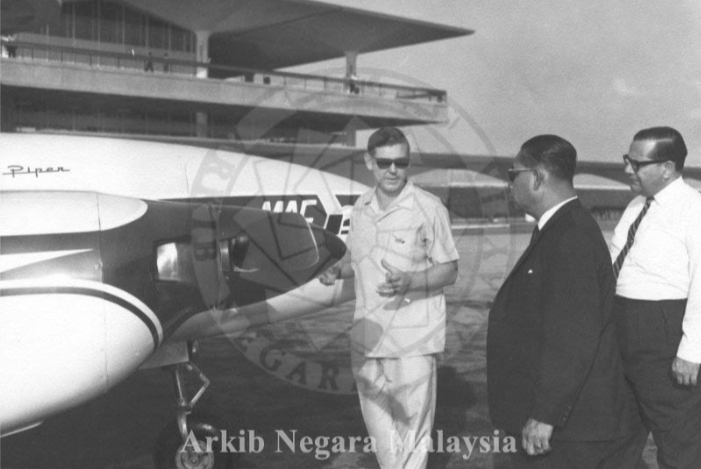
Bussell (left) and Sardon Jubir (center) with Piper Aztec (1966)

The airline was established on 13 February 1962 by British pilot Francis Jan Bussell. Initially, a flight to the Cameron Highlands using a hydro-electric lake for approach was planned. However, the project was never built.

MAC started operations on 14 May 1962 by Sardon Jubir with five aircraft. The company used to fly over Bukit Besi, Bukit Ibam, Hong Kong, Indonesia, Iran, Rompin and Thailand in about 40 airfield for iron mining. Sardon Jubir purchased two hangars from Subang Airport in 1966.

Before Bussell returned to England, he sold his airlines to Borneo Company Limited. Later, MAC converted into Inchcape Group following the company merger.

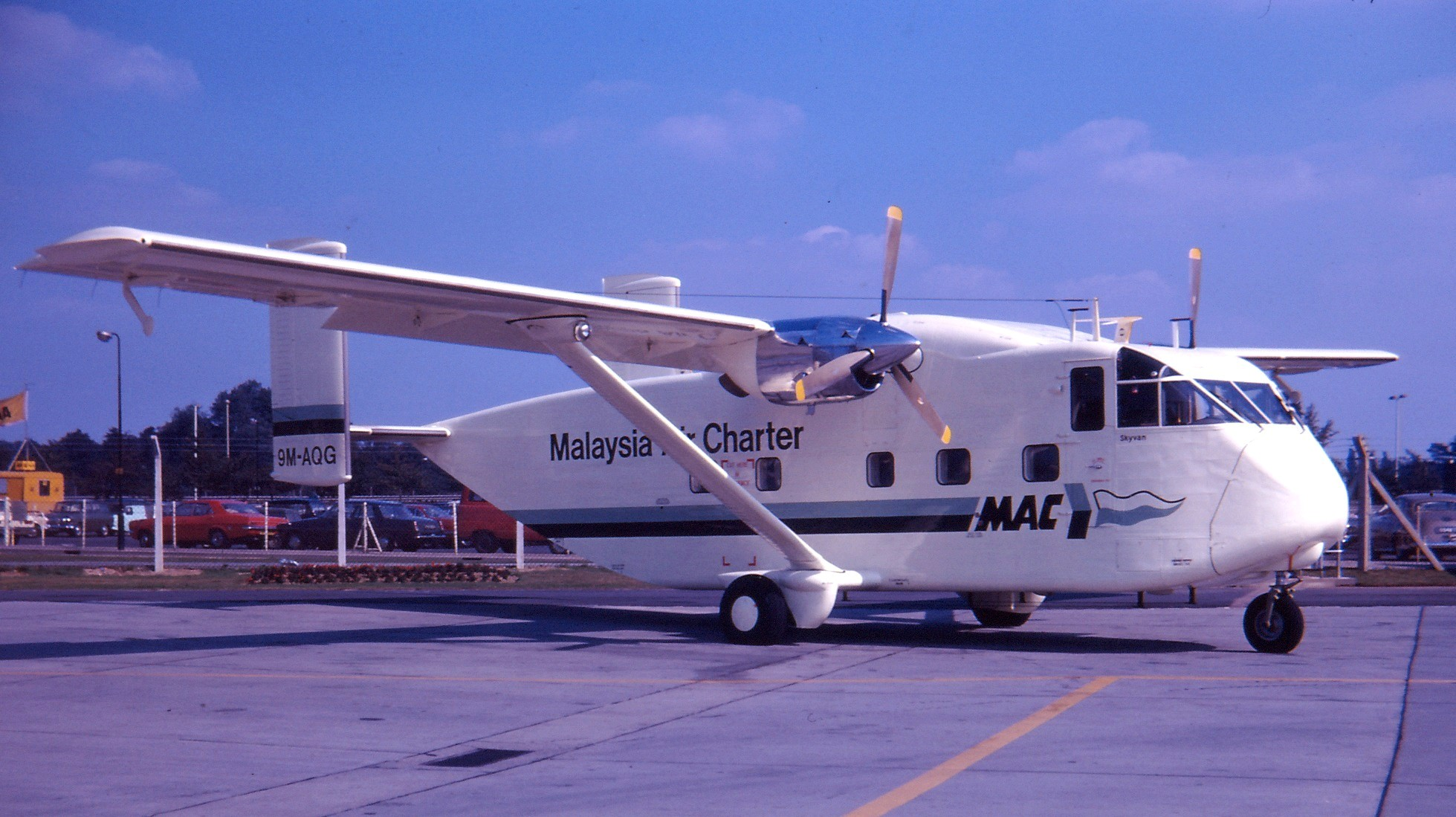
A pre-delivery Skyvan

In March 1973, MAC formed a subsidiary, Malaysia Air Training (MAT), in Sultan Abdul Aziz Shah Airport, becoming the first flight training school in Malaysia.

=== Expansion (1975-1986) ===
A former bank company, Bank Bumiputra Berhad, acquired Malaysia Air Charter from the Inchcape Group and became MARS Finance. In 1982, the airline expanded its fleet with the addition of a Short 360, bringing its total fleet count to 11 aircraft. The introduction of the Short 360 was intended to enhance the carrier's operational capabilities, allowing it to expand its route network and increase passenger capacity.

=== Closure ===
In September 1986, MACAir was placed into receivership after defaulting on a RM5,000,000 loan repayment to UMBC Leasing; the airline went bankrupt and its operating licence was suspended. The company had RM50,000,000 owed to various leasing companies. Creditors Coopers & Lybrand unsuccessfully attempted to salvage the viable Kerteh route.

Competitors, including Wira Kris and Pan Malaysia Air Transport, declined to acquire the company. Pelangi Air later took over MAC's route.

The company's decline led to legal proceedings in the 1990s. Petronas Dagangan, a major creditor, filed a petition against the airline following its failure to settle debts. The subsequent legal battle, Malaysia Air Charter Co Sdn Bhd v Petronas Dagangan Sdn Bhd, reached the Federal Court and established key legal precedents regarding commercial insolvency and the validity of statutory notices of demand in Malaysia. Macair eventually went into liquidation in 1996 following the conclusion of these insolvency proceedings.

== Destinations ==
MACAir served the following destinations:

Country	City	Airport	Notes
Malaysia	Alor Setar	Sultan Abdul Halim Airport	
Malaysia	Batu Berendam	Batu Berendam Airport	
Malaysia	Bayan Lepas	Bayan Lepas International Airport	
Malaysia	Fraser's Hill	Fraser's Hill Helipad	
Malaysia	Genting Highlands	Genting Helipad	
Malaysia	Kerteh	Kerteh Airport	Focus city
Malaysia	Kuching	Kuching International Airport	
Malaysia	Langkawi	Langkawi International Airport	
Malaysia	Mersing	Mersing Airport	
Malaysia	Segambut	Segambut Helipad	
Malaysia	Subang	Sultan Abdul Aziz Shah Airport	Hub
Malaysia	Tioman Island	Tioman Airport	
Singapore	Seletar	Seletar Airport	

=== Codeshare agreements ===
MACAir held codeshare agreements with Tradewinds Airlines.

== Fleet ==
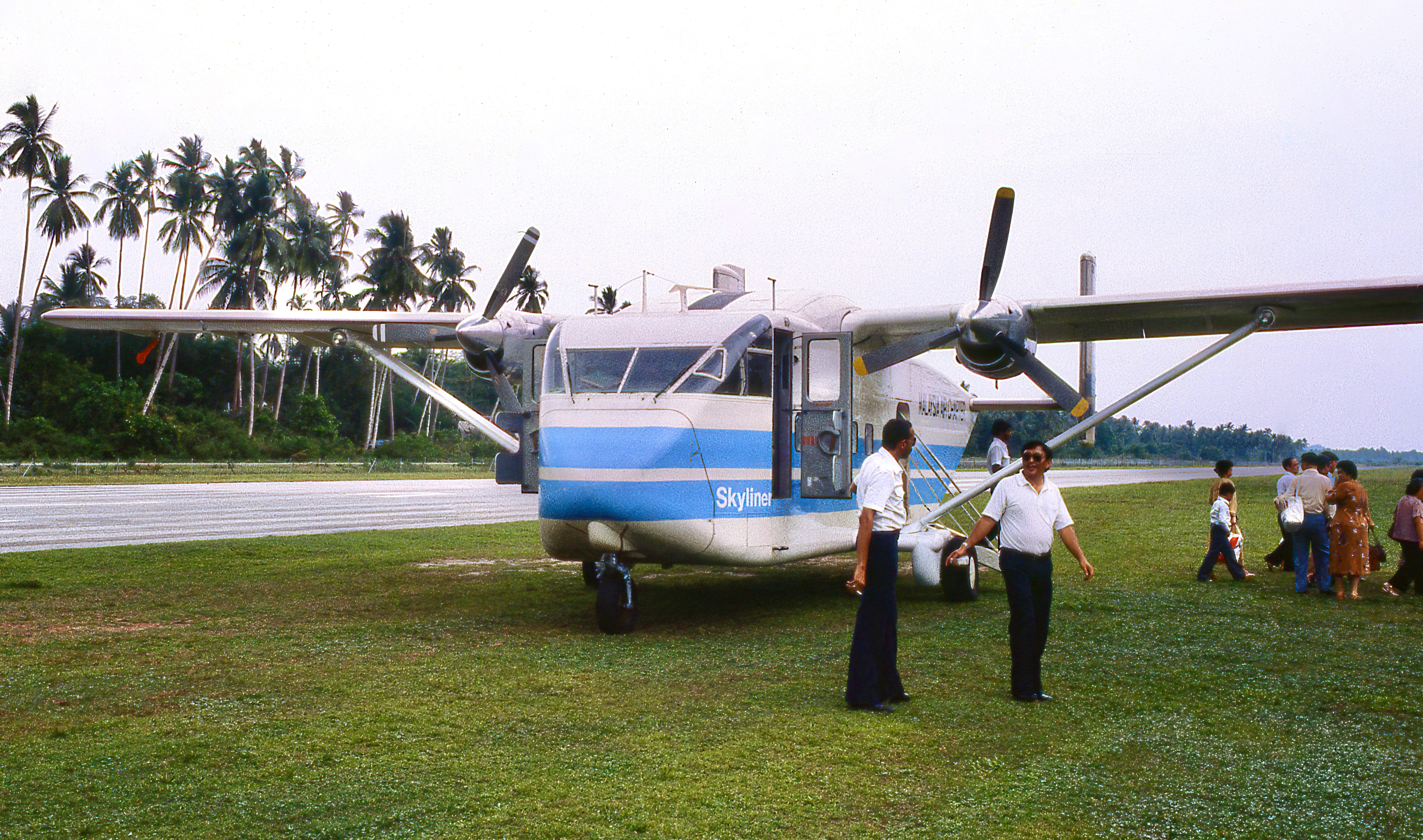
MACair Short SC.7 Skyvan (1980)

MAC fleet consisted of the following aircraft:

MAC fleet
Aircraft	Total	Introduced	Retired	Ref
Alouette III	1	1970	1973	
Bell 206B	1	1980	Unknown	
Britten-Norman BN-2 Islander	2	1974	1986	
CASA C-212-200 Aviocar	4	1981	Unknown	
Cessna 310	3	1962	1982	
Curtiss C-46 Commando	1	1975	Unknown	
Dornier 228	3	1983	1986	
Fairchild Hiller FH-1100	2	1969	1977	
Lockheed 12A	1	1964	1966	
Piper Aztec	1	1966	1986	
Piper Navajo	2	1969	1986	
Piper Pawnee	2	1968	1986	
Short 360	1	1984	1986	
Short SC.7 Skyvan	7	1978	1986	
Westland Widgeon	1	1966	Unknown	

== Accidents and incidents ==
Malaysia Air Charter (MAC) experienced a total of five hull-loss accidents during their operations, all of which resulted in two fatalities:

- On 26 October 1966, a MAC Lockheed 12A (9M-ANK) was destroyed after crash landing in Bukit Besi, Terengganu. None of the occupants were injured, the aircraft was later written-off from service.
- On 15 August 1967, a Cessna 185 (9M-AMK) crashed on take-off at Ba'kelalan Airport, Sarawak, only one person was injured. The aircraft lost in the incident was the same plane that was filmed in 1965 France-Italian film Up to His Ears.
- On 7 January 1970, a Piper Aztec carrying one crew and two passengers crash-landed in Paya Lebar Airport. None of the occupants were injured, the aircraft was repaired the same day before returning to service.
- On 2 August 1973, two occupants were killed after a helicopter crashed into a house in Sungai Buloh, Selangor when the aircraft flied into severe thunderstorm. Only one person on the ground were injured.
- On 18 December 1980, two Shorts SC.7 Skyvan (9M-AQG and 9M-AXN) collided in unknown circumstances in Bayan Lepas International Airport, both aircraft appeared to be slightly damaged and continued to service beyond repair.

== See also ==
- List of defunct airlines of Malaysia
