= Flymojo =

Planned Malaysian regional airline

flymojo
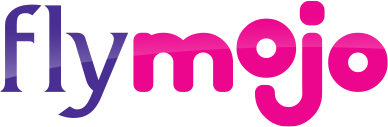
| IATA | ICAO | Call sign |
|---|---|---|
| — | — | MOJO |
- Founded: 2015
- Ceased operations: 2016 (airline never started operations)
- Hubs: Senai International Airport
- Secondary hubs: Kota Kinabalu International Airport
- Parent company: Fly Mojo Sdn Bhd
- Headquarters: Bandar Sri Damansara, Kuala Lumpur, Malaysia
- Key people: Alies Anor Abdul, Chairman; Janardhanan Gopala Krishnan, Managing Director
- Website: www.flymojo.com.my

Fly Mojo Sdn Bhd (doing business as flymojo) was a planned regional airline owned by Government of Malaysia. The new carrier, announced in 2015, would be based at Senai International Airport, Johor with a secondary hub at Kota Kinabalu International Airport, Sabah. However, the airlines never started and their air operator's certificate (AOC) expired on 30 May 2016 without any extension sought by the airlines.

== History ==
On 17 March 2015, the Government of Malaysia announced a formation of 'value carrier' at Langkawi International Maritime and Aerospace Exhibition (LIMA) 2015, targeting the ASEAN travel market and the surrounding region. The airline had originally planned to commence operations in October 2015, but this plan was put on hold due to financing issues and delays in Bombardier's CSeries program.

According to Deputy Transport Minister, Aziz Kaprawi, Flymojo would improve connectivity between Peninsular Malaysia and Sabah and Sarawak. Positioning its hub in Senai International Airport would help transform the airport into a key regional aviation and logistics hub. It would also play a key role in developing Iskandar Malaysia in the Southern Corridor of Malaysia.

On 30 May 2016, a deadline for Flymojo to start the process that would lead to receiving an air operator's certificate (AOC) expired, without an extension being sought by the airline. The Department of Civil Aviation Malaysia had previously issued a licence that allowed Flymojo to raise funds and acquire aircraft, but delays in certification of the Bombardier CSeries meant that the airline had no aircraft — a pre-requisite for an AOC application to proceed.

== Planned destinations ==
The airline planned to operate to the following destinations within Malaysia:

| City | Airport | Notes | Ref |
|---|---|---|---|
| Johor Bahru | Senai International Airport | Hub | |
| Kota Kinabalu | Kota Kinabalu International Airport | Hub | |

== Fleet ==
Flymojo signed a letter of intent (LOI) with Bombardier Aerospace for the sale and purchase of 20 CS100 aircraft, with the option for an additional 20 CS100 aircraft. This order, when firmed, will be valued at approximately US$1.47 billion (RM5.44 billion), and could increase to US$2.94 billion (RM10.87 billion) if Flymojo exercises all options.

== See also ==
- List of airlines of Malaysia
- List of airports in Malaysia
- Transport in Malaysia
