= Silver Fly =

Short-lived Malaysian airline

Silver Fly Sdn Bhd
IATA	ICAO	Call sign
SF	SFI	SILVERFLY
- Founded: 2009
- Commenced operations: 16 March 2010
- Ceased operations: 20 March 2010
- Hubs: Sultan Azlan Shah Airport
- Focus cities: Banda Aceh; Ipoh; Medan
- Fleet size: 3
- Destinations: 5
- Parent company: Silver Fly Smile Tours Sdn. Bhd.
- Headquarters: Ipoh, Malaysia
- Key people: Hasim Othman (executive chairman)
- Website: www.silverfly.com.my

Silver Fly Sdn Bhd (doing business as Silver Fly) was a Malaysian airline that flew for a few days in March 2010 and ceased regular scheduled flights before May 2010.

== History ==
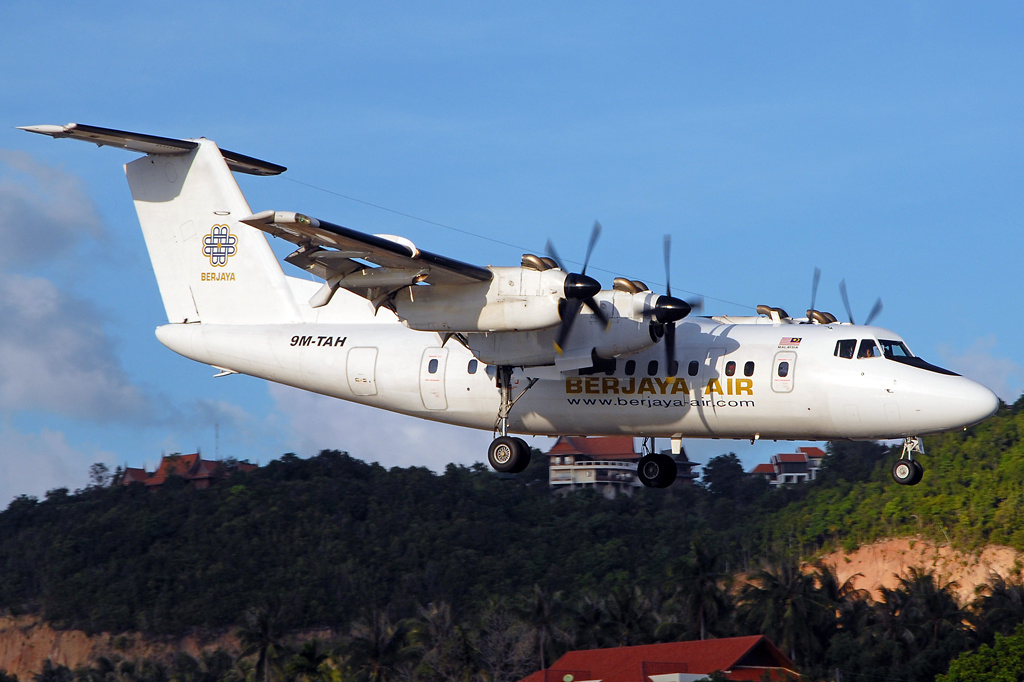
The airline lease one of Berjaya Air Dash 8 (9M-TAH), with the logo except the tail removed while Silver Fly logo painted besides exit door

In August 2009, Silver Fly signed a joint flight service agreement with Riau Airlines for Riau to operate services to Indonesia between Ipoh and Medan, using a Fokker 50 aircraft. However, the agreement with Riau was terminated.

Subsequently, Silver Fly leased two ATR 72 aircraft from Berjaya Air. An initial flight to Kota Baharu in Kelantan was on 6 March 2010.

The formal launching of the company was held on 16 March 2010, at the Sultan Azlan Shah Airport. Perak Menteri Besar Datuk Seri Dr Zambry Abdul Kadir officiated the launching. The event included the landing of a de Havilland Canada Dash 7 aircraft leased from Berjaya Air. According to the Ipoh Echo, the launch flight was also the last flight.

== Destinations ==
Silver Fly operates the following destinations:

- Indonesia
  - Medan (Polonia International Airport)
- Malaysia
  - Kota Bharu (Sultan Ismail Petra Airport)
  - Ipoh (Sultan Azlan Shah Airport) (hub)
  - Kuala Lumpur (Sultan Abdul Aziz Shah Airport)
- Singapore
  - Changi (Changi Airport)
