= Pelangi Air =

Regional airline of Malaysia (1987-2001)

Pelangi Airways Sdn Bhd

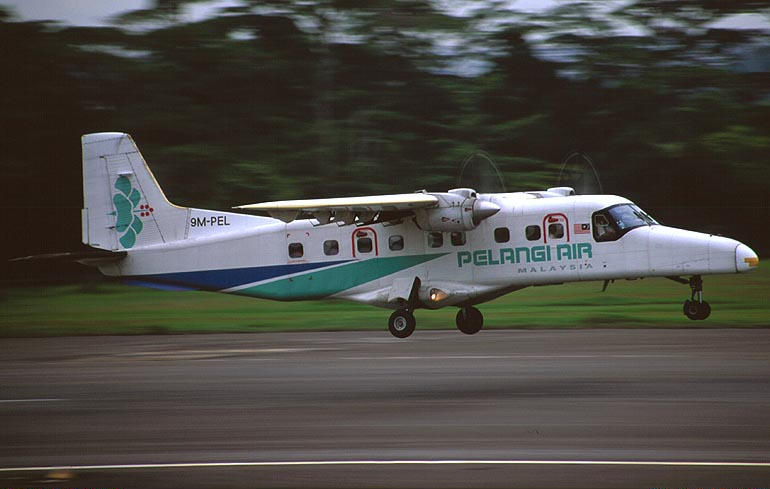
- Pelangi Air Dornier 228-202K landing at the Seletar Airport in Singapore, October 1999.
IATA	ICAO	Call sign
9P	PEG	PELANGI
- Founded: September 18, 1987; 39 years ago
- Commenced operations: January 1, 1988; 38 years ago
- Ceased operations: October 21, 2001
- Hubs: Sultan Abdul Aziz Shah Airport
- Focus cities: Ipoh; Malacca-Batu Berendam
- Frequent-flyer program: Pelangi Airways Wings
- Fleet size: 5
- Destinations: 20
- Parent company: Naluri Berhad
- Headquarters: Shah Alam, Kuala Lumpur, Malaysia
- Key people: Ismail Abu Bakar (1987-1993; CEO & General Manager); Zain Salahin (1993-2001; CEO & General manager)
- Employees: 339 (1998)
- Website: www.pelangair.com

Pelangi Airways was a regional airline of Malaysia based at Kuala Lumpur Subang Airport. The airline covered secondary routes within Peninsular Malaysia and international flights to Sumatra in Indonesia, Thailand and Singapore.

== History ==
=== 1987-1990: Early operations ===
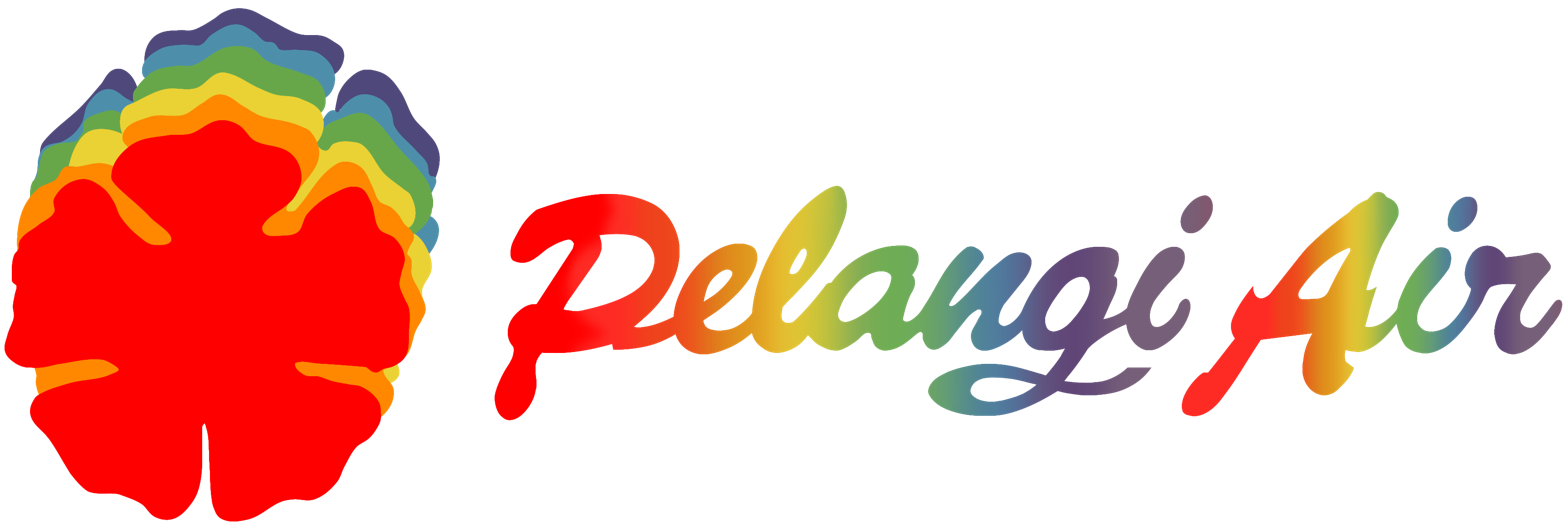
Logo used since 1989 until 1990

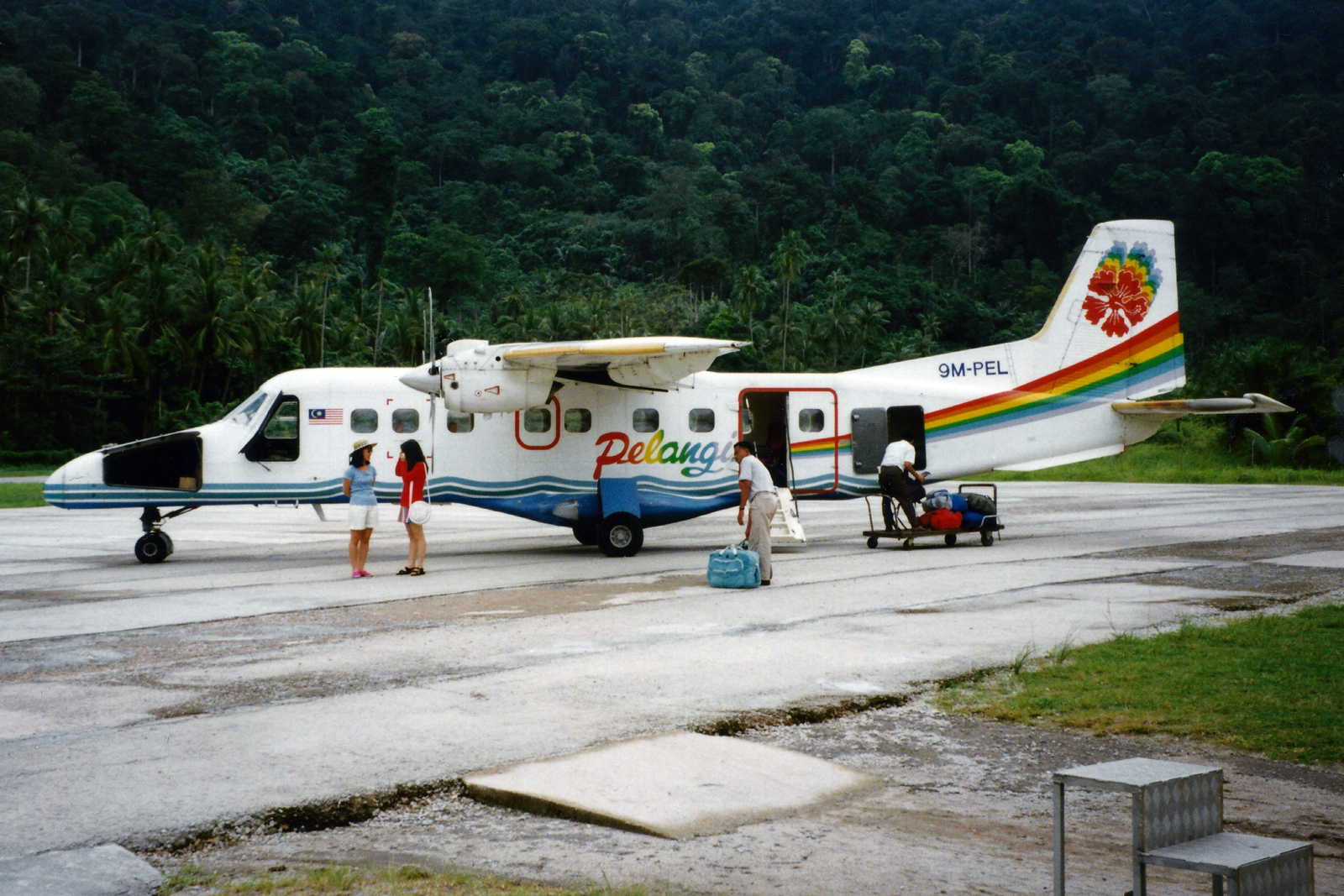
Pelangi Air Dornier 228-202K departed in Tioman Airport

Following the cessation of operations by Malaysia Air Charter (MACAir), Malaysia Airlines determined that the airline's feeder routes were unsuitable for larger aircraft. Then-Prime Minister Mahathir Mohamad subsequently proposed the establishment of a new domestic airline to operate those routes while complementing, rather than replacing, Malaysia Airlines. As a result, Pelangi Air was incorporated and took over the former MACAir routes. The airline launched its Inaugural flight 9M-910, at approximately 10:50 a.m. on New Year's Day, 1988, as the aircraft arrived to Sultan Mahmud Airport, Terengganu.

As of January 1989, the airline has expanded 11 routes across Malay Peninsular.

Pelangi Air was known for participating in the 1990 Malaysia International Air Race (also known as the Paris–Langkawi–Paris Air Race) with a Dornier 228 aircraft under the name Pelangi team. At the time of the event, the airline's General manager served as the aircraft's pilot. The pilot won the first leg of the race, helping the team win the overall trophy.

=== 1991-1997: Expansion and Acquisitions ===
Pelangi Air purchased two Fokker 50 aircraft, enabling the airline to launch operations across Sumatra, as well as charter flights throughout Southeast Asia.

The airline was also interviewed by Channel 7HD following its inaugural flight from Ipoh to Hat Yai, marking its first media coverage outside Malaysia and Singapore. Pelangi Air was renamed to Pelangi Airways in 1994.

In November 1996, Malaysia Airlines proposed to acquire Pelangi Airways as part of efforts to reorganise its operations, as of 1998, no process of the acquisition was made and Pelangi Airways continued operation.

=== 1998-2002: Financial difficulties and closure ===
Pelangi Airways continued operation in November 2000, most employees began a silent strike against the airline following the non-payment of their wages. It has also stranded 60 passengers.

Pelangi Airways was forced to shutdown all of its operation in October 2001. Following the shutdown, Berjaya Air took over its route to Seletar Airport and their aircraft were abandoned at Sultan Abdul Aziz Shah Airport and Senai International Airport.

Malaysia Airlines, Malaysia Airports, and two other companies successfully petitioned the High court to place Pelangi Airways into liquidation, bringing an end to its 13 years of operations.

=== 2001-2002: Successors attempt ===
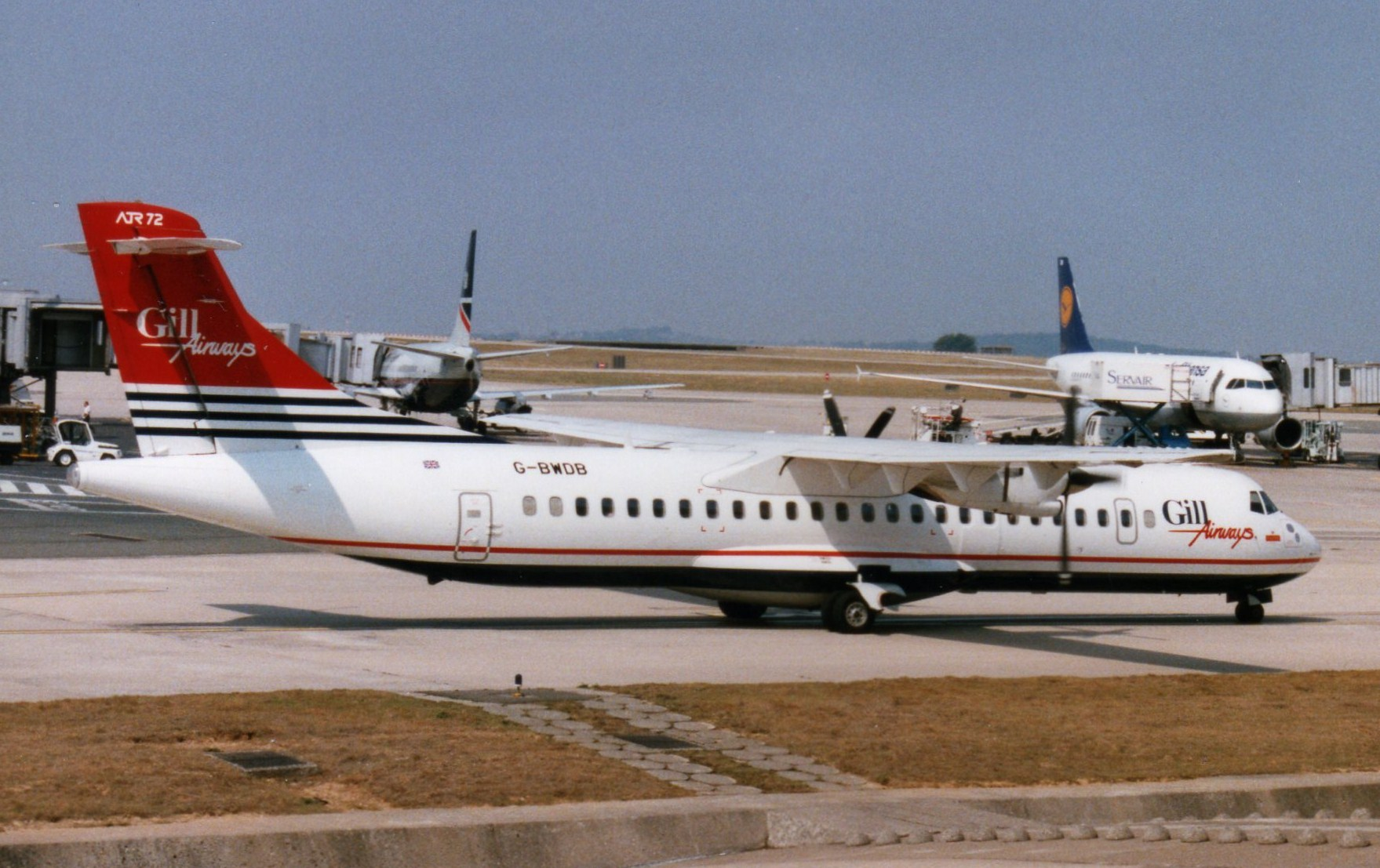
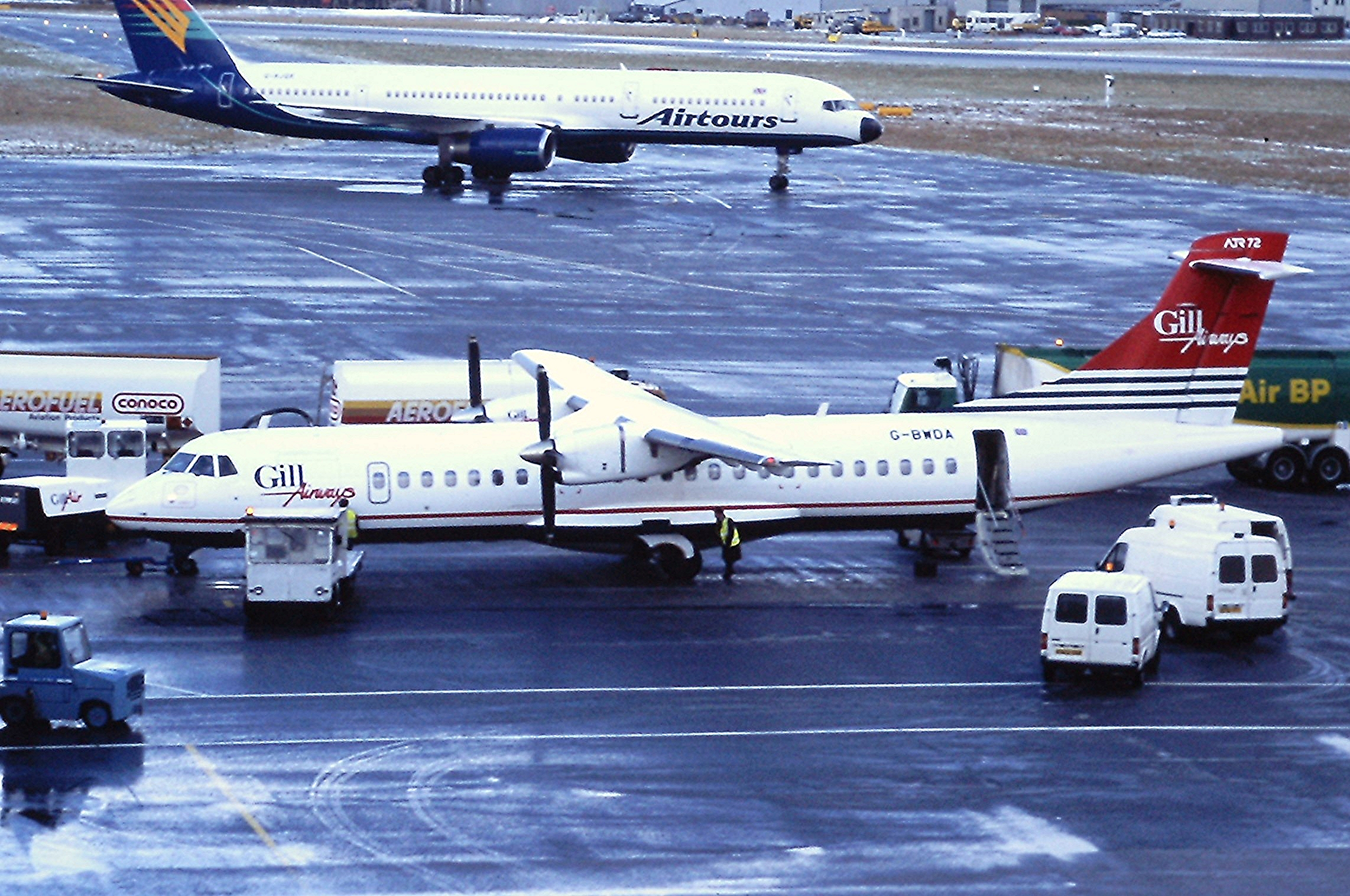
The ATR 72-200 previously operated by Gill Airways, seen here which is G-BWDB (above) and G-BWDA (bottom). Both aircraft was due to be delivered in 2003 as 9M-AMA and 9M-AMB

Aero Malaysiana was a planned regional airlines based in Sultan Abdul Aziz Shah Airport founded in 2001 by Malaysian businessman Syed Yusof.

In 2002 during Asian Aerospace Air Show in Singapore, the Franco-Italian aircraft manufacturer ATR announced that the airline has signed to acquired both ATR-72-200.

However, the planned was abandoned and never did begin operation.

== Corporate affairs and identity ==
=== Headquarters ===
Pelangi Air was headquartered at Block two at Worldwide Business Center in Shah Alam; the airline was previously headquartered at the Technology Resources Tower (TR Tower), Jalan Ampang, Kuala Lumpur.

=== Ownership and structure ===
As of 2000, Pelangi Air was owned by four Malaysian states. Terengganu, who controls a 38% stake in the airline, Selangor (20.5%), Perak (15.0%), and Malacca (2%).

=== Branding ===
In 11 December 1987, Pelangi Air introduced their first livery featuring six rainbow-coloured stripes extending across the rear fuselage and vertical stabilizer, together with a red Bunga Raya emblem on the tail. According to the airline, the six colours were chosen because pelangi is the Malay word for "rainbow", while the hibiscus was incorporated to reflect Malaysia's cultural and national identity. Blue wave motifs along the lower fuselage were intended to represent the airline's focus on holiday and island resort destinations.

== Destinations ==
- Indonesia
  - Banda Aceh (Sultan Iskandarmuda Airport)
  - Medan (Polonia International Airport)
  - Padang (Tabing Airport)
  - Palembang (Sultan Mahmud Badaruddin II Airport)
  - Pekanbaru (Sultan Syarif Kasim II International Airport)
- Malaysia
  - Alor Star (Sultan Abdul Halim Airport)
  - Ipoh (Sultan Azlan Shah Airport)
  - Johor Bahru (Senai International Airport)
  - Kerteh (Kerteh Airport)
  - Kota Bharu (Sultan Ismail Petra Airport)
  - Kuala Lumpur (Sultan Abdul Aziz Shah Airport)
  - Kuala Terengganu (Sultan Mahmud Airport)
  - Kuantan (Sultan Haji Ahmad Shah Airport)
  - Langkawi (Langkawi International Airport)
  - Malacca (Batu Berendam Airport)
  - Pangkor (Pangkor Airport)
  - Penang (Bayan Lepas International Airport)
  - Tioman (Tioman Airport)
- Singapore
  - Singapore (Seletar Airport)
- Thailand
  - Ko Samui (Samui Airport)
  - Phuket (Phuket International Airport)

== Fleet ==
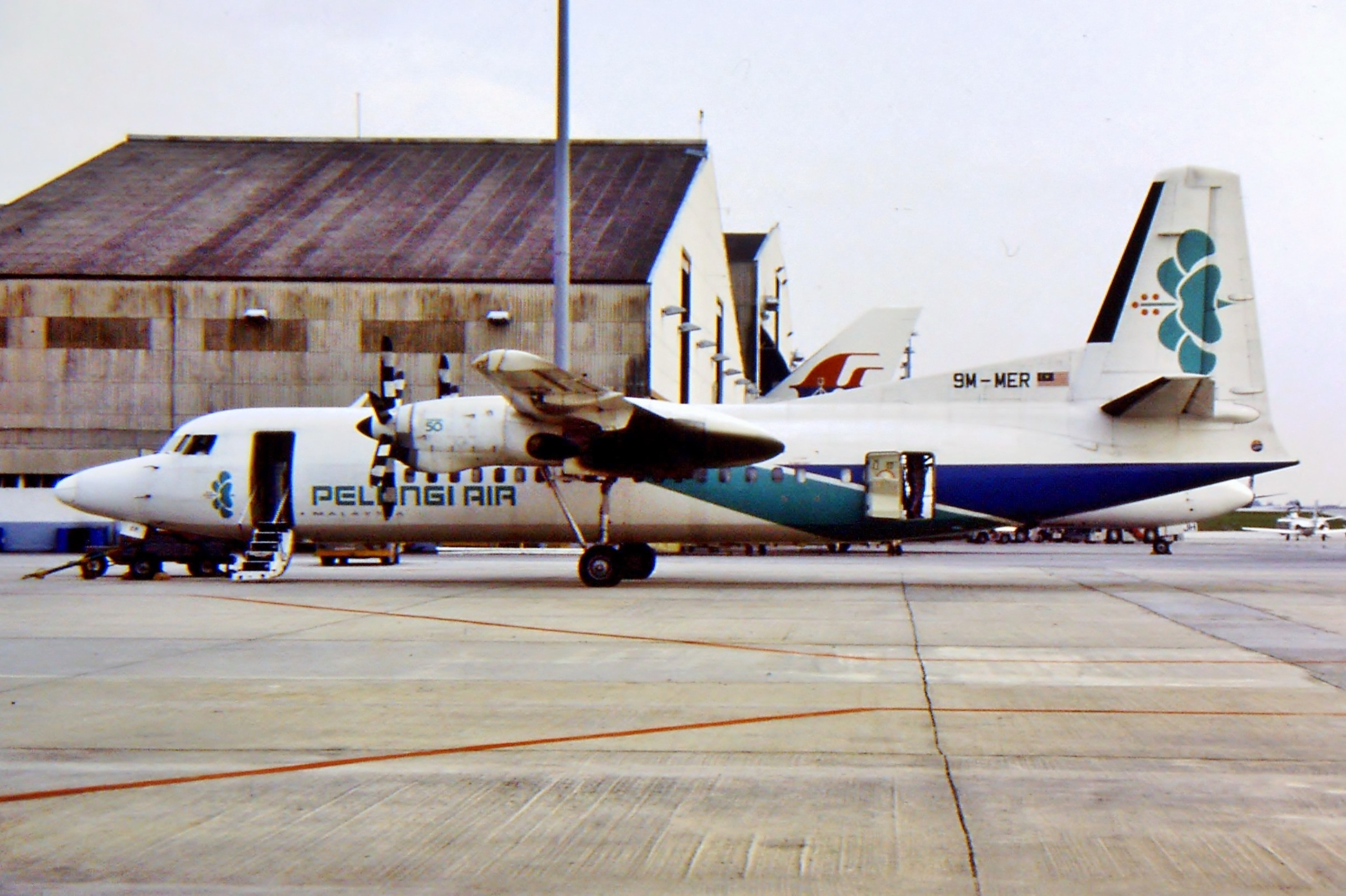
A Pelangi Air Fokker 50 (9M-MER) parking at the Sultan Abdul Aziz Shah Airport in Malaysia, October 1994

Prior ceased operation in 2001, Pelangi Air fleet consisted of:

Pelangi Air fleet
Aircraft	Total	Introduced	Retired	Note
Dornier 228-202K	3	1989	2001	One crashed as Flight 3312
Fokker 50	2	1992	2001	

=== Fleet development ===
Pelangi Air started services using two DHC-6-300 Twin Otter previously operated by Schreiner Airways.

In December 1989, Pelangi Air ordered and acquired Dornier 228. Meanwhile in March 1991, the airline signed and acquired Fokker 50 to expand destinations outside Malaysia.

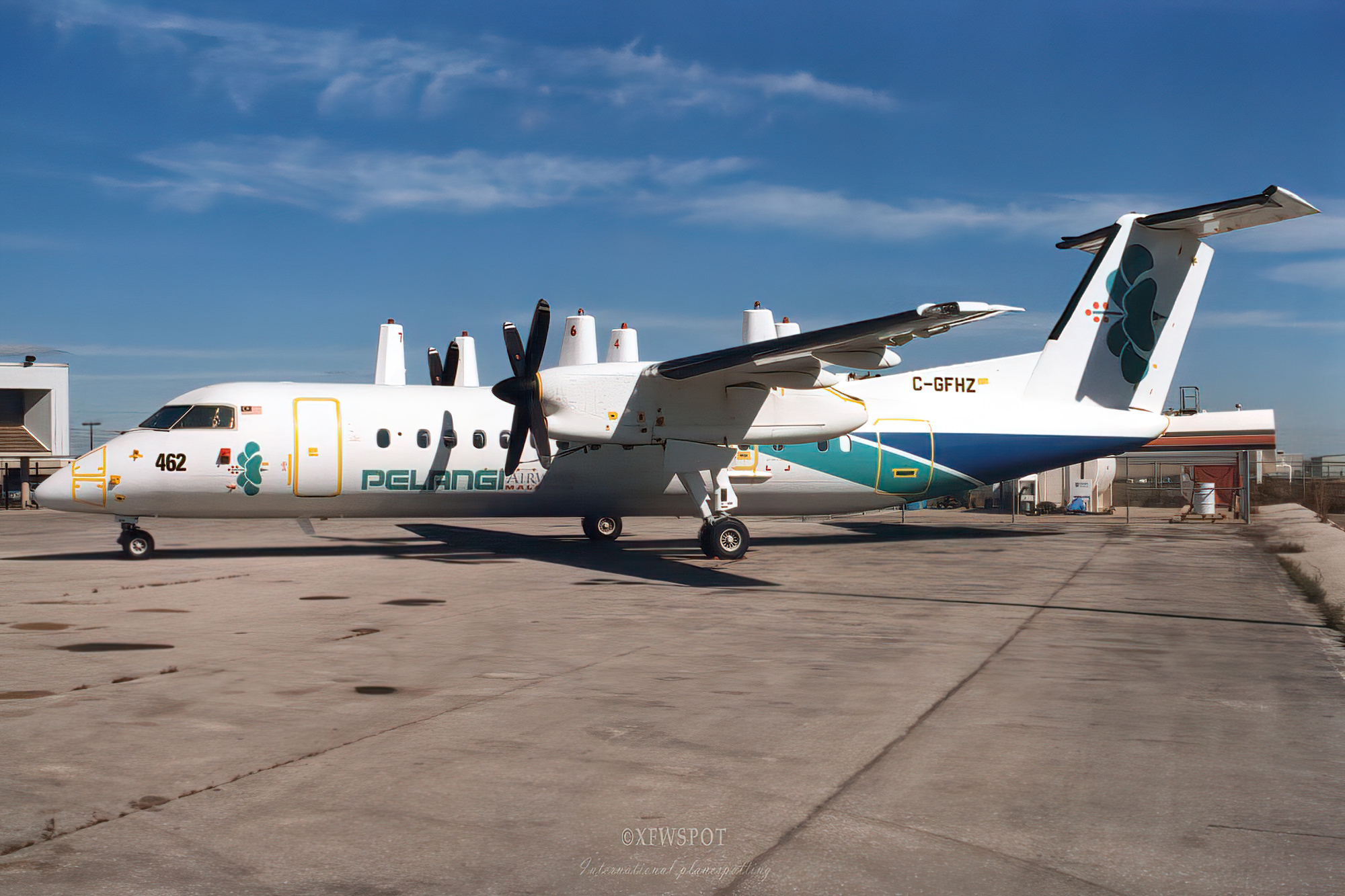
C-GFHZ (previously G-BRYV), one of the three Dash 8-300 (G-BRYU and G-BRYW) that were painted in Pelangi Airways livery.

In 1995 during LIMA '95, it had announced that the airline ordered four De Havilland Canada Dash 8-200 and two Dash 8-300 for its current aircraft replacement. Expected to be delivered in June-July 1996, however, it was delayed as Malaysia Airlines acquiring 70% stake until their cancellation following Asian financial crisis in 1998.

In March 1994, Pelangi Airways has leased two Fokker 50 from Malaysia Airlines, which was lasted until 1997.

In 1998, Pelangi Air leased two of the Fokker F28 Fellowship from lesser company Tranasian Air Australia and one leased from Mafira Air Charter for its replacement of Fokker 50. It was also planned to expanding destinations such as Brunei, Bintulu, Bandung and Solo.

The airline also wet-lease a Boeing 737-200 passenger configurations from Transmile Air Services and wear Aero Asia livery to few domestic route for a temporarily period in 2000.

== Incidents and accidents ==
- On 2 February 1995, a Berjaya Air Harbin Y-12-II (9M-TAE) from Tioman to Subang collided with a parked Dornier 228-202K (9M-PEL) during taxiing, 19 occupants were safe without injury and the aircraft was written off. Initial report suggested it was a hydraulic brake fault.
- On 18 October 1995, an Dornier 228-212K (9M-PEQ) leased to Air Maldives operated as Flight 3312, crashed into the sea in Velana International Airport after abruptly turned right, left the runway, struck the seawall and somersaulted into the adjacent lagoon while landing. The plane was written off. Of the eight on board, three were injured but there were no fatalities.
- On 15 June 1997, a Dornier 228-202K collided with parked twin-engine aircraft at Tioman Airport, none of the occupants were injured.
