= Ked-Air =

Ked-Air Sdn. Bhd.
IATA	ICAO	Call sign
—	—	KEDAH AIR
- Founded: November 2003
- Commenced operations: 20 January 2004 (Planned)
- Ceased operations: 2006
- Hubs: Sultan Abdul Halim Airport
- Fleet size: 3 (Planned)
- Headquarters: Alor Setar, Kedah, Malaysia
- Key people: Sharyl Eskay Abdullah (Chairman)

Ked-Air was a planned low-cost airline based in Alor Star, Malaysia operating domestic service. The company officially ceased operations in 2006.

== History ==
The airlines was founded in mid-2003, and were planned to operate, but due to low passenger, the project becoming delay on September 2003.

In November 2004, Ked-Air was purposed to start its operations on 20 January 2004. It was also seeking to buy defunct Malaysian airline Pelangi Air.

== Destination ==
Ked-Air planned to commenced regional service between Alor Star and Medan, Indonesia. However, as of late 2006, the operation has been ceased.

- Indonesia
  - Banda Aceh (Sultan Iskandar Muda International Airport)
  - Jakarta (Soekarno-Hatta International Airport)
  - Medan (Polonia International Airport)
- Malaysia
  - Alor Star (Sultan Abdul Halim Airport) (hub)
  - Kota Bharu (Sultan Ismail Petra Airport)
- Thailand
  - Bangkok (Suvarnabhumi Airport)
  - Chiang Mai (Chiang Mai International Airport)
  - Phuket (Phuket International Airport)

== Fleet ==
The airline planned to acquire a Fokker 100 aircraft wet-leased from Indonesian carrier Merpati Nusantara Airlines, Including Boeing 737-200 for flight to Medan
