= Athena Air Services =

Airline of Malaysia (2003-2006)

- Founded: 2003
- Commenced operations: November 18, 2003
- Ceased operations: 2006
- Fleet size: 1
- Destinations: 1
- Parent company: Athena Sdn Bhd (50%) PT Avipatria (50%)
- Headquarters: Senai International Airport, Johor, Malaysia

Athena Air Services was a airline based in Johor Bahru, Malaysia in the early 2000s. It operated scheduled, domestic and international passenger services.

== History ==
The airline company was established in 2003 and began its operations on 18 November 2003. It was owned jointly by Athena Sdn Bhd and PT Avipatria. In 2004 it was considered by analysts as a small budget airline worth watching, with plans for expansion, but restricted by lack of a website for bookings. The airline finally ceased all operations in 2006.

== Services ==
At launch, Athena Air Services planned to operate flights to Jakarta and Surabaya from Senai International Airport.

== Fleet ==
The Athena Air Services fleet consisted of 1 Boeing 727-200.
