= MJets Air =

Malaysian cargo airline

MJets Air Sdn Bhd

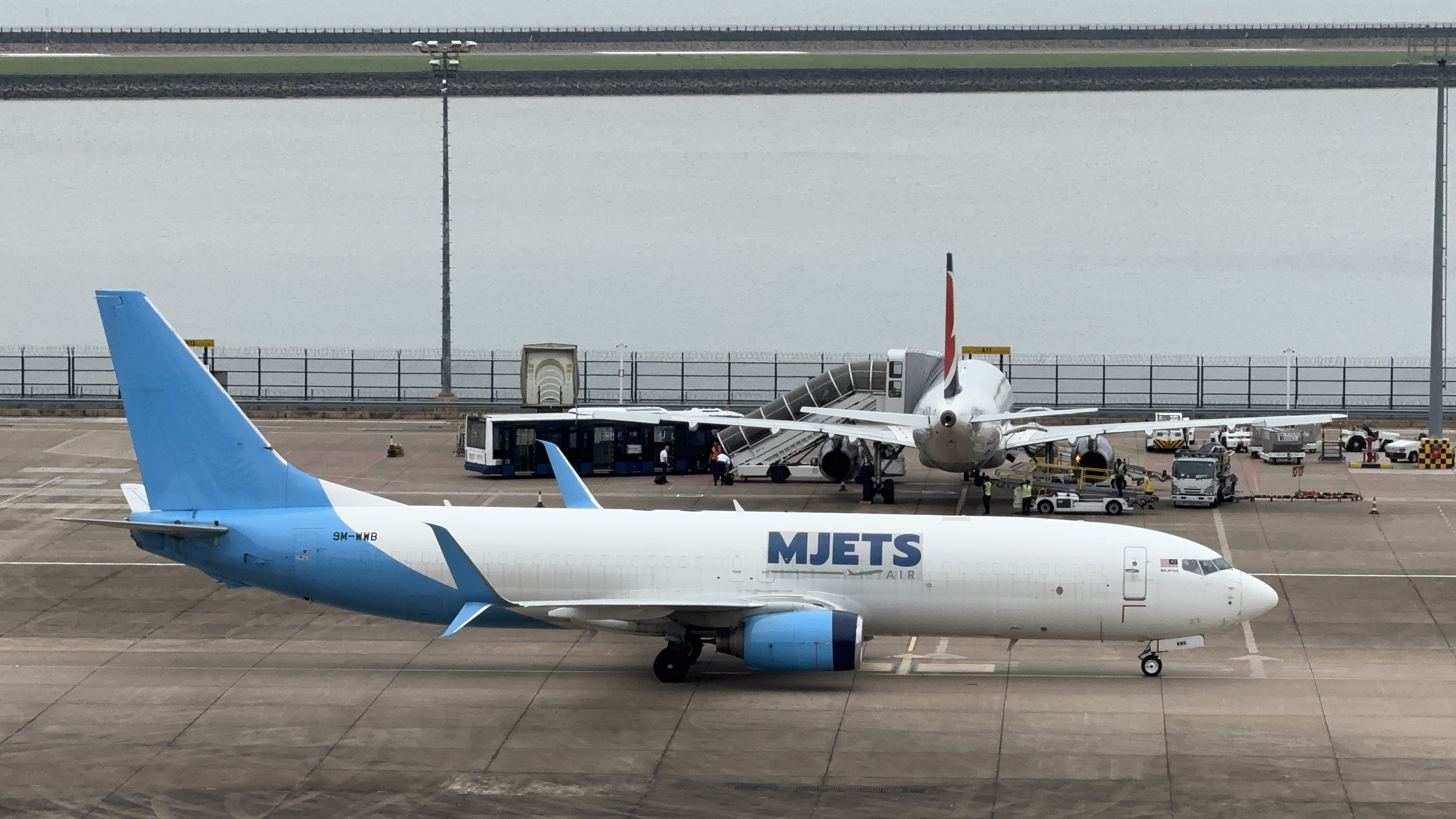
- MJets Air Boeing 737-800F arriving at Macau International Airport
IATA	ICAO	Call sign
WW*	KXP	KARGO XPRESS
- Founded: January 9, 2018; 8 years ago (As Love2Fly)
- Commenced operations: June 10, 2021; 5 years ago (As Kargo Xpress) July 1, 2024; 2 years ago
- Hubs: Kuala Lumpur International Airport
- Fleet size: 7
- Destinations: 17
- Parent company: MMAG Aviation Consortium
- Headquarters: Kuala Lumpur, Malaysia
- Website: www.mjetsair.com

MJets Air (stylized in all caps) is a cargo airline with its head office in the KLIA Cargo Village in the grounds of Kuala Lumpur International Airport (KLIA) in Sepang District, Selangor, Malaysia. It is owned by MMAG Aviation Consortium.

== History ==
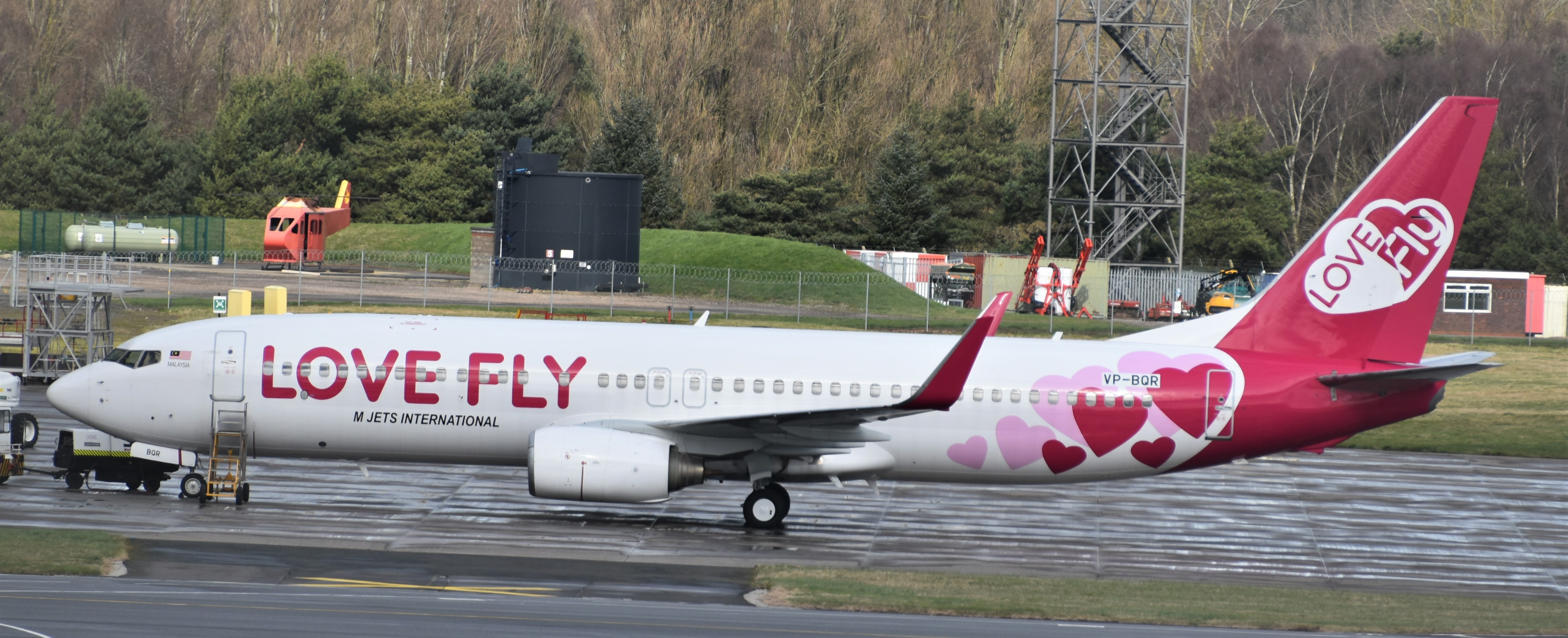
A Boeing 737-800 painted in Love2Fly livery, but a delivered was cancelled, seen in Birmingham Airport

=== 2018–2020: Love2Fly ===
The airlines was originally founded in 2018 as M Jets International under the brand Love2Fly, it was based in Penang International Airport and planned to launch passenger operation in 2019 with a leased Boeing 737-800. However, it was delayed until November 2020 and the aircraft was returned to its lessor

In November 2020, MMAG Holdings Berhad acquired the airline with 80% equity while 20% from Aerotech.

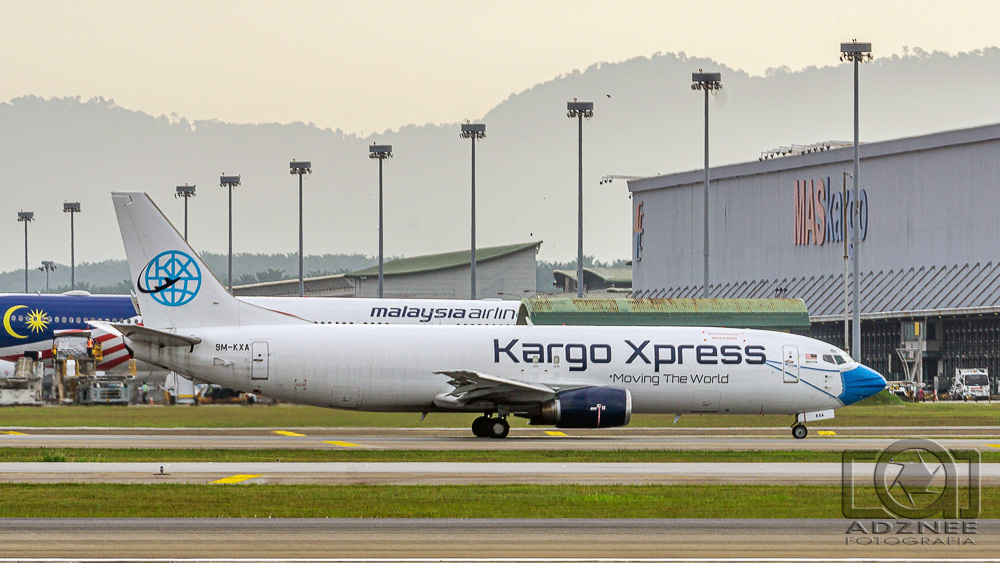
Kargo Xpress Boeing 737-400SF arriving at Kuala Lumpur International Airport

=== 2021–2024: Kargo Xpress ===
M Jets International received AOC from the Civil Aviation Authority of Malaysia on 8 June 2021 and was prepared to launch cargo operation under the brand Kargo Express. The airline made its inaugural flight to Sarawak on 10 June 2021 Kargo Xpress became the first Malaysian airline to implement CHAMP's Cargospot cargo management solution, used for cargo booking, inventory, and operational management.

In 1 July 2024, M Jets international renamed as MJets Air.

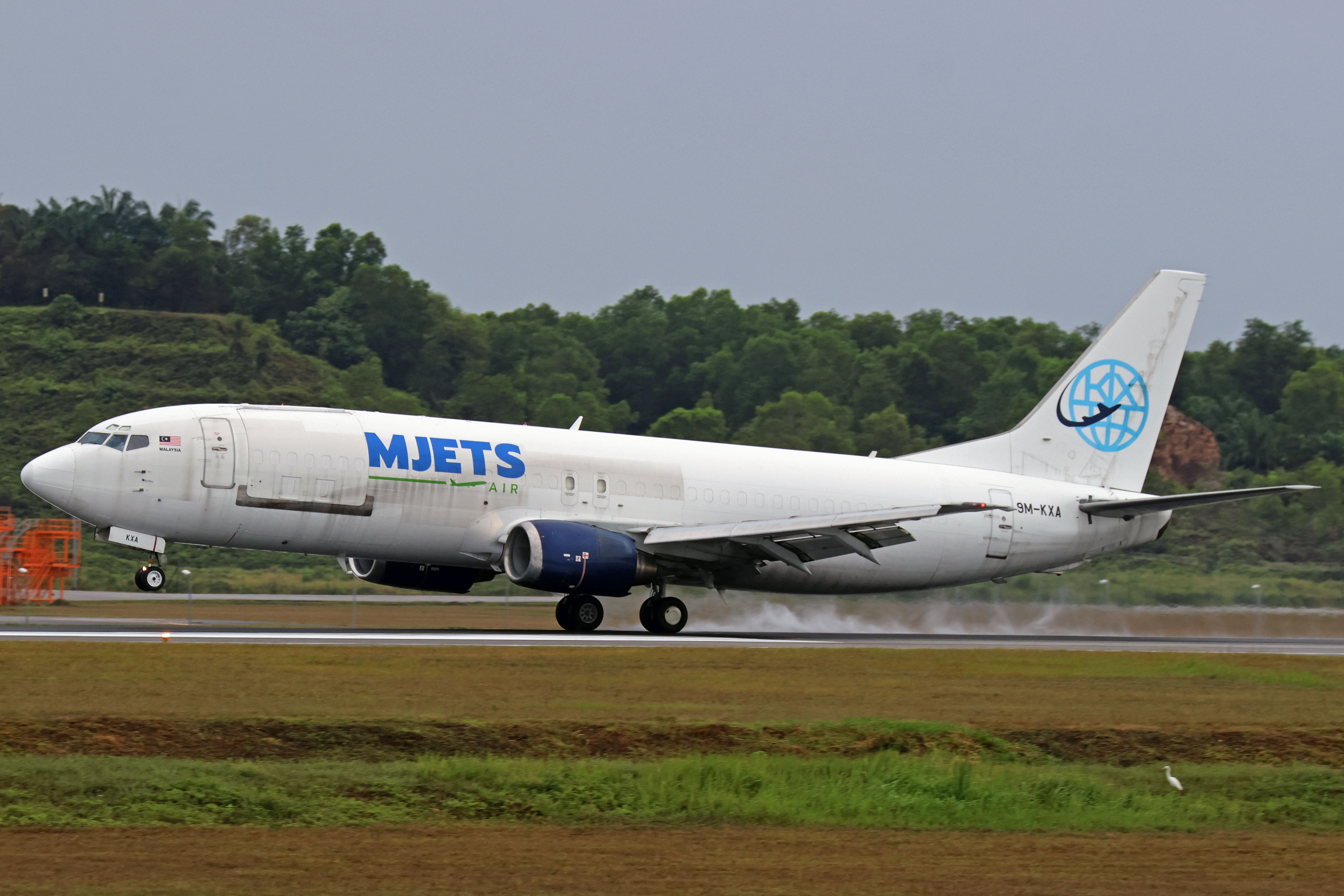
MJets Air Boeing 737-400F landing at Kuala Lumpur International Airport, with Kargo Xpress branding remained visible on the aircraft's tail

=== 2024–present: MJets Air ===
MJets launched its scheduled flight in October 2025 to Sandakan, making it the only cargo airline to regularly operate there.

However, MJets later faced financial distress after recording sustained losses, with its total liabilities exceeding its assets, prompting operational restructuring and workforce cost-saving initiatives in 2026.

== Destination ==
=== Interline agreement ===
MJets Air has interline agreements with the following airlines:

- All Nippon Airways
- Qatar Airways Cargo
- Teleport

=== Scheduled destination ===
MJets Air serves the following destinations with cargo flights on a regular, scheduled basis:

Country	City	Airport	Notes
Brunei	Bandar Seri Begawan	Brunei International Airport	
China	Chengdu	Chengdu Shuangliu International Airport	
China	Kunming	Kunming Changshui International Airport	
China	Nanjing	Nanjing Lukou International Airport	
Hong Kong	Chek Lap Kok	Hong Kong International Airport	
Indonesia	Jakarta	Soekarno–Hatta International Airport	
Macau	Taipa	Macau International Airport	
Malaysia	Kota Kinabalu	Kota Kinabalu International Airport	
Malaysia	Kuala Lumpur	Kuala Lumpur International Airport	Hub
Malaysia	Kuching	Kuching International Airport	
Malaysia	Penang	Penang International Airport	
Malaysia	Sandakan	Sandakan Airport	
Philippines	Manila	Ninoy Aquino International Airport	
Singapore	Changi	Changi Airport	
South Korea	Incheon	Incheon International Airport	
Taiwan	Taoyuan	Taoyuan International Airport	
Vietnam	Ho Chi Minh City	Tan Son Nhat International Airport	

== Fleet ==
=== Current fleet ===
As of July 2026, MJets Air operates the following aircraft:

MJets Air fleet
Aircraft	In service	Orders	Notes
Boeing 737-400SF	2	—	
Boeing 737-800BCF	4	—	
Boeing 747-200SF	1	—	Previously operated by Aerostan
Total	7		

== See also ==
- List of airlines of Malaysia
