= Indonesian Airlines =

Indonesian airline, active 1999–2007

| IATA | ICAO | Call sign |
|---|---|---|
| IO | IAA | INDO LINES |
- Founded: 1999
- Commenced operations: 2001
- Ceased operations: 2007
- Operating bases: Soekarno-Hatta International Airport
- Hubs: Achmad Yani Airport
- Secondary hubs: Ngurah Rai Airport
- Focus cities: Surabaya Juanda International Airport
- Fleet size: 5
- Destinations: 46
- Headquarters: Jakarta, Indonesia
- Key people: Rudy Setyopurnomo
- Website: www.indonesian-airlines.co.id

Indonesian Airlines (PT Indonesian Airlines Aviapatria) was an airline based in Jakarta, Indonesia. It operated domestic services within Indonesia.

The Transportation Ministry in February 2007 delayed license revocation of 11 idle airlines, including Indonesian Airlines, to give restructuring opportunities to the operators.

== History ==
The airline was established in 1999 and started operations in March 2001. In September 1999 it had won a government licence to provide scheduled services on 46 routes. It is owned by private investors (75%) and Rudy Setyopurnomo (25%), President Director of the airline. Indonesian Airlines ceased operations in 2003, for reasons unspecified, and had its Air Operating Certificate revoked after the February 2007 Transportation Ministry recall. It previously operated flights within Indonesia from Jakarta and from Jakarta to Dubai. Rudy Setyopurnomo then worked for RGM Group to handle its fleet of four small airplanes.

== Fleet ==
The Indonesian Airlines fleet consisted of the following aircraft in August 2006:

- 1 Boeing 727-200

Previously it operated two Boeing 737-300 aircraft (delivered in March 2002), one Boeing 747SR and one Boeing 747-300 aircraft (delivered in December 2002 and January 2003).
