= World Cargo Airlines =

Malaysian cargo airline

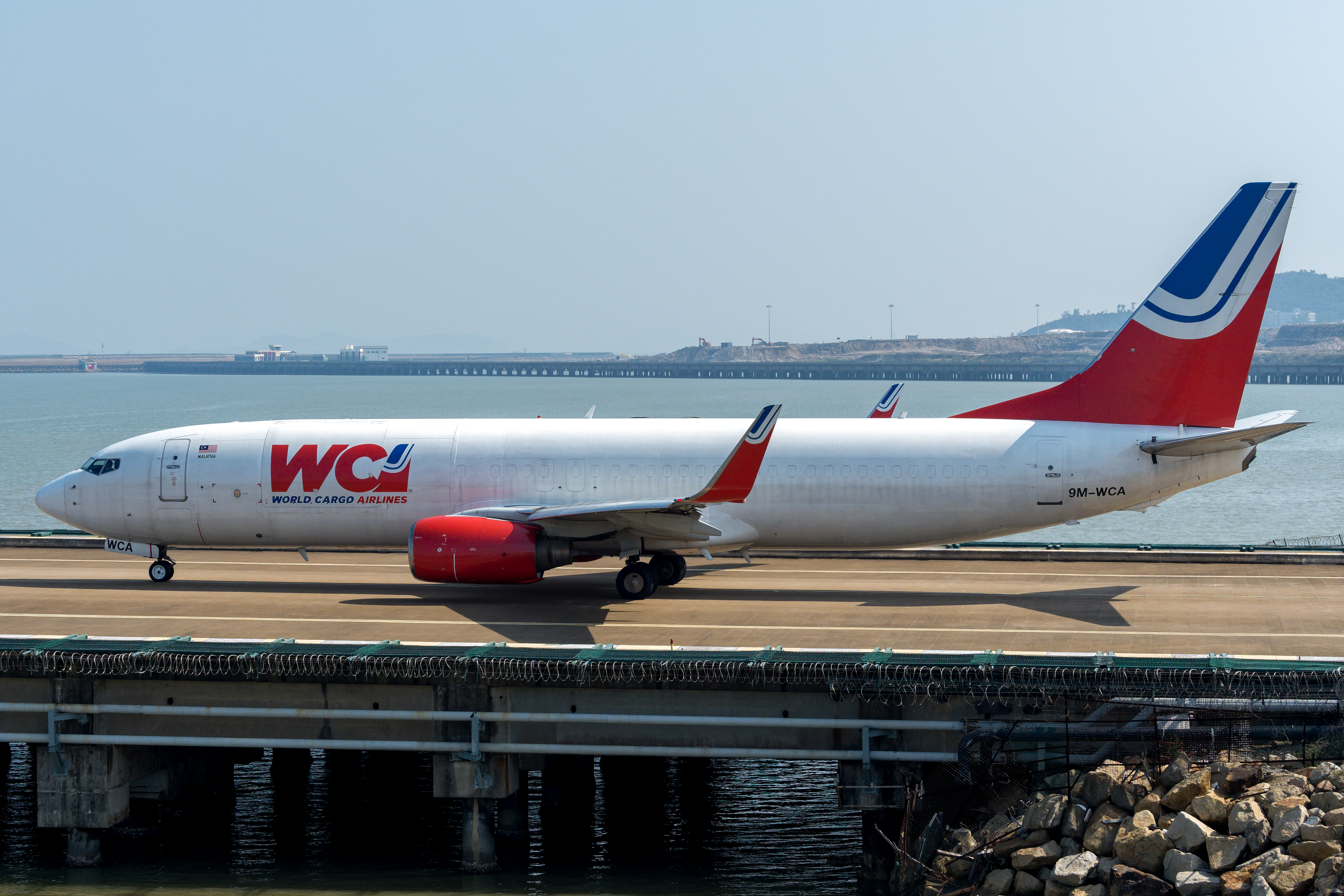
IATA	ICAO	Call sign
3G	WCM	WORLD CARGO
- Founded: 1996; 30 years ago
- Hubs: Kuala Lumpur International Airport
- Fleet size: 2
- Destinations: 22
- Parent company: Asia Cargo Network Sdn Bhd & Pos Aviation Sdn Bhd
- Headquarters: Malaysia
- Employees: 167

World Cargo Airlines, formerly known as Pos Asia Cargo Express Sdn Bhd, is an airline company based in Malaysia. Currently, they operate 1 Boeing 737-400F to the East Malaysia cities of Kuching, Miri, Kota Kinabalu, Tawau and Sibu as well as cities in Peninsular Malaysia such as Johor Bahru, Pulau Pinang and Kota Bharu. Its second aircraft, the first Boeing 737-800F in South East Asia, begun operations on 23 March 2021. Its third aircraft, a Boeing 737-300 (9M-WCM) begun operations in November 2021.

== History ==
Prior to its recent rebranding in 2020, POS ACE was a 100% subsidiary of POS Malaysia Berhad, the national postal company of Malaysia. Pos Malaysia have, over many decades, outsourced the delivery of its mails and parcels to East Malaysian sectors from Kuala Lumpur and other Peninsula Malaysia states to freighter operators and commercial carriers.

Since the late 80s and 90s, Transmile Air was contracted to operate 2 Boeing narrow body freighter aircraft for this purpose. Over spilt cargos were loaded on board commercial flights including Malaysia Airlines and others operating the East Malaysian routes of Sabah and Sarawak. This operation takes place on a daily basis almost 24/7 and 365 days a year. Sometime in 2007, a new operator called Gading Sari Aviation took the stage and secured the same contract from Transmile Air. Gading Sari operated the same routes for Pos Malaysia until sometime in 2013 when Pos Malaysia, under the direction of its parent company DRB HICOM, decided to buy over Gading Sari Aviation and operate the airline as its own subsidiary. A rebranding took place after the completion of that full acquisition. The airline was named POS ACE after that.

POS ACE had leased 2 units of B737-400F from an American lessor and operated it for 6 years until such time in 2019 when Asia Cargo Network Sdn Bhd ("ACN") was selected to provide the lease of 2 units of the same model of aircraft to replace the expiry of the previous lease from the American operator. The replacement aircraft was delivered to POS ACE in mid 2019. Later on, during the 4th quarter of 2019, POS Malaysia decided to appoint ACN as the Manager of POS ACE. Hence, in addition to the leasing contract of the freighter aircraft to POS ACE as mentioned earlier on, ACN was then appointed to manage POS ACE i.e. the total management of the airline company.

Pursuant to the success of POS ACE under its management, ACN was then offered the privilege to partner with POS Malaysia and acquire 51% (majority) shareholding stake in POS ACE. The signing of the Acquisition was made on 19 August 2020 making ACN the 51% shareholder of POS ACE and a partner to the esteemed Pos Malaysia Berhad. POS ACE hence went through a second rebranding and this time was named World Cargo Airline Sdn Bhd.

== Destinations ==
- Kuala Lumpur - Kuala Lumpur International Airport (Main Hub)
- Kuching-Kuching International Airport
- Miri - Miri Airport
- Kota Kinabalu - Kota Kinabalu International Airport
- Tawau - Tawau Airport
- Sibu - Sibu Airport
- Johor Bahru - Senai International Airport
- Penang - Penang International Airport
- Kota Bharu - Sultan Ismail Petra Airport
- Macau - Macau International Airport
- Ho Chi Minh City - Tan Son Nhat International Airport
- Yangon - Yangon International Airport
- Narita - Narita International Airport
- Phnom Penh - Phnom Penh International Airport
- Kunming - Kunming Changshui International Airport
- Shenzhen - Shenzhen Bao'an International Airport
- Manila - Ninoy Aquino International Airport
- Cebu - Mactan–Cebu International Airport
- Davao - Francisco Bangoy International Airport
- Singapore - Changi International Airport
- Hong Kong - Hong Kong International Airport
- Jakarta - Soekarno-Hatta International Airport

== Fleet ==
=== Current fleet ===
As of July 2026, World Cargo Airlines operates the following aircraft:

Aircraft	In service	Remarks
Boeing 737-400F	1	
Boeing 737-800BCF	1	
Total	2	

=== Former fleet ===
As of August 2025, World Cargo Airlines operated 1 Boeing 737-400F and 2 Boeing 737-800BCF.

The airline also previously operated the following aircraft:

- 1 Boeing 737-300F
- 2 Boeing 737-400F (9M-GSA & 9M-GSB)
- 1 further Boeing 737-800BCF

== See also ==
- MASkargo
