= Raya Airways =

Cargo airline of Malaysia

Raya Airways Sdn Bhd
- Airline logo since 2025

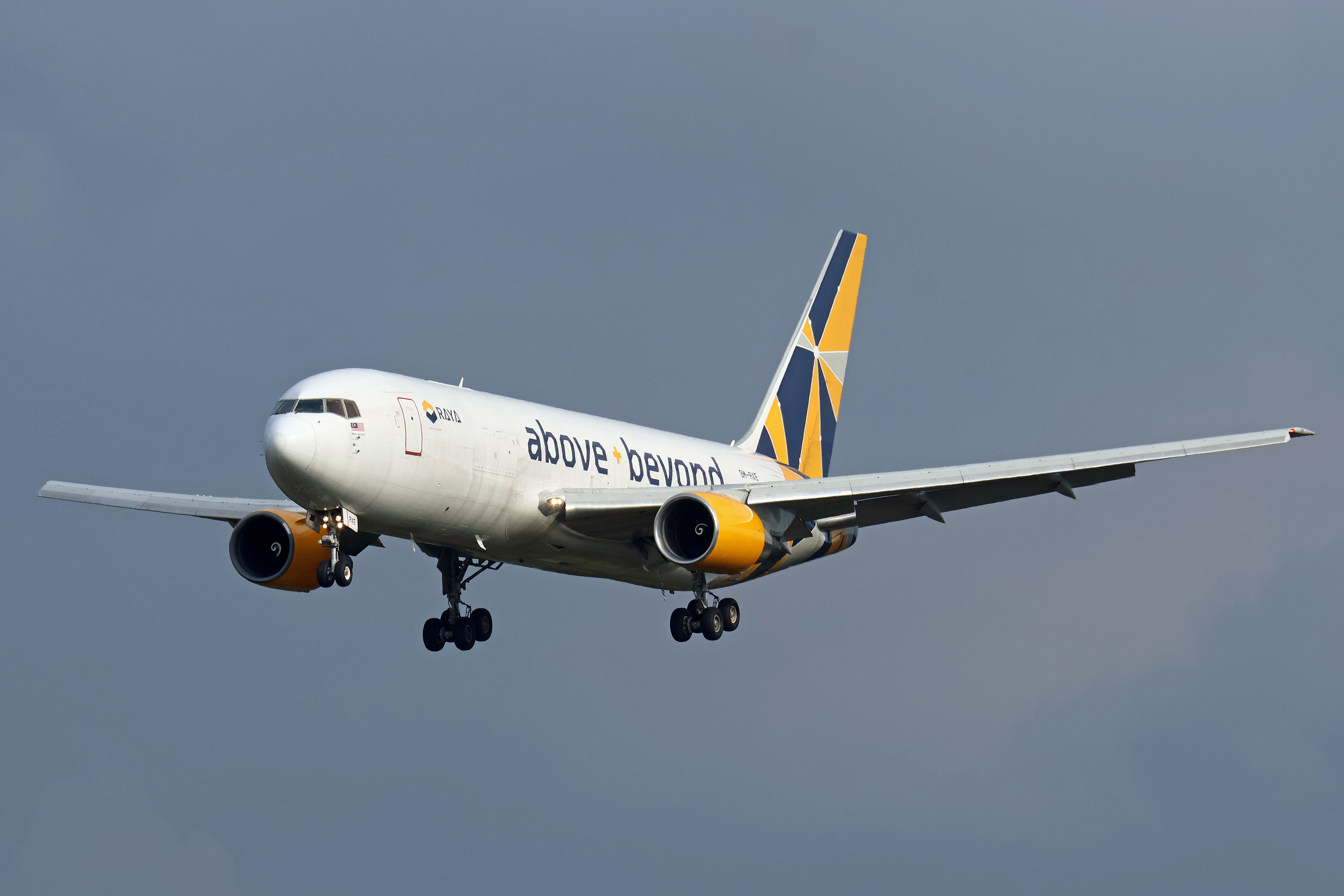
- Raya Airways Boeing 767-200BDSF
IATA	ICAO	Call sign
TH	RMY	RAYA EXPRESS
- Founded: November 1993; 32 years ago
- Commenced operations: October 2014; 12 years ago (as Raya Airways)
- Hubs: Kuala Lumpur–International; Kuala Lumpur–Subang
- Fleet size: 8
- Destinations: 10
- Headquarters: Cyberjaya, Selangor, Malaysia
- Website: www.rayaairways.com

Raya Airways is a cargo airline with its head office at Cyberjaya, Selangor and the main hub for Raya Airways at Kuala Lumpur International Airport in Sepang, Selangor, Malaysia.

It is an express freight and freighter charter company. The airline was established in November 1993 as Transmile Air. It has courier transportation services between Peninsular Malaysia and East Malaysia and services international companies such as DHL, United Parcel Service, Air Macau and CEN Worldwide. Raya Airways also provides aircraft charters and wet leases specialists with experience operating cargo flights around the world. Raya Airways was designated a National Cargo Carrier by the Malaysian Transport Ministry in 1996.

Raya Airways is owned by Mohamad Najib Ishak. The previous CEO, Lee Shashitheren, was fired for corruption.

Raya has expanded its fleet with the addition of the A321P2F, bringing its total fleet count to six. The A321P2F will enhance the carrier's capabilities to cater to a wider customer base, expand its network reach and improve its cargo handling capacity.

The cargo airline posted a net profit for the year ending 31 December 2020 with revenue of MYR334.12 million (US$79.9 million), and MYR3. The expected revenue for 2023 was 4-500 million MYR.

== History ==
Raya Airways began its operations as Transmile Air Services with one Boeing 737 and one Cessna Grand Caravan, in providing air express transport service to Pos Malaysia Berhad for their courier business to East Malaysia in November 1993. It later developed into an international company and the only dedicated intra-Asian overnight express cargo operator in Malaysia. Their first Boeing 727 freighter service commenced in 2000 for the Kuala Lumpur/Penang-Bangkok-Hong Kong courier sector. It was an extended operation for their existing client, DHL International Limited. Over five years, owing to the increasing demand of freight services in the region, Transmile Air Services increased its Boeing 727 fleet to 10. As part of the strategy to expand its operations and network of connecting routes, Transmile Air Services acquired four MD-11s in 2005. The airline started the MD-11 operation for Kuala Lumpur-Hong Kong-Los Angeles sector in the third quarter of 2005.

From 2002 to 2006, Transmile Air Services provided air cargo service to Air Macau. In 2014, the Airline was rebranded as Raya Airways. Their subsidiaries are K-Mile Air of Thailand and now-defunct Megantara Air of Indonesia, both of which operated aircraft transferred from their fleet.

== Destinations ==
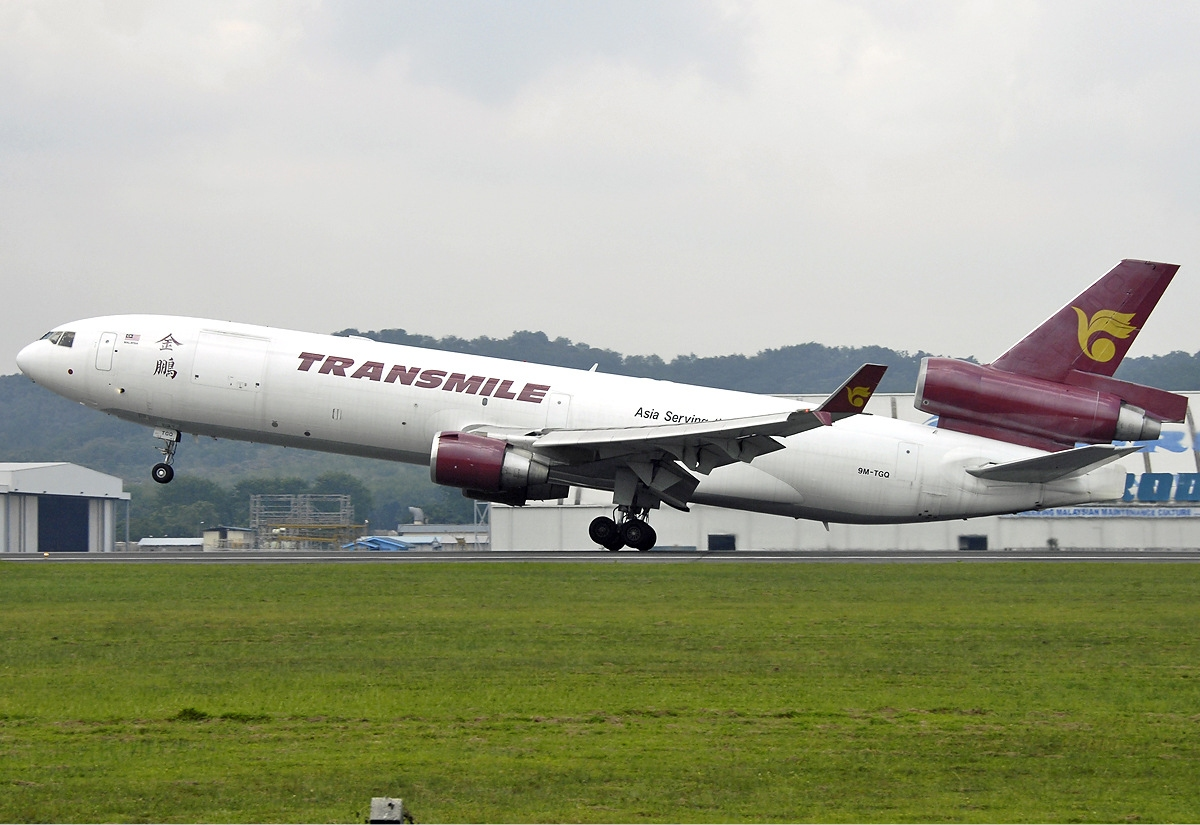
Transmile Air Services, McDonnell Douglas MD-11F

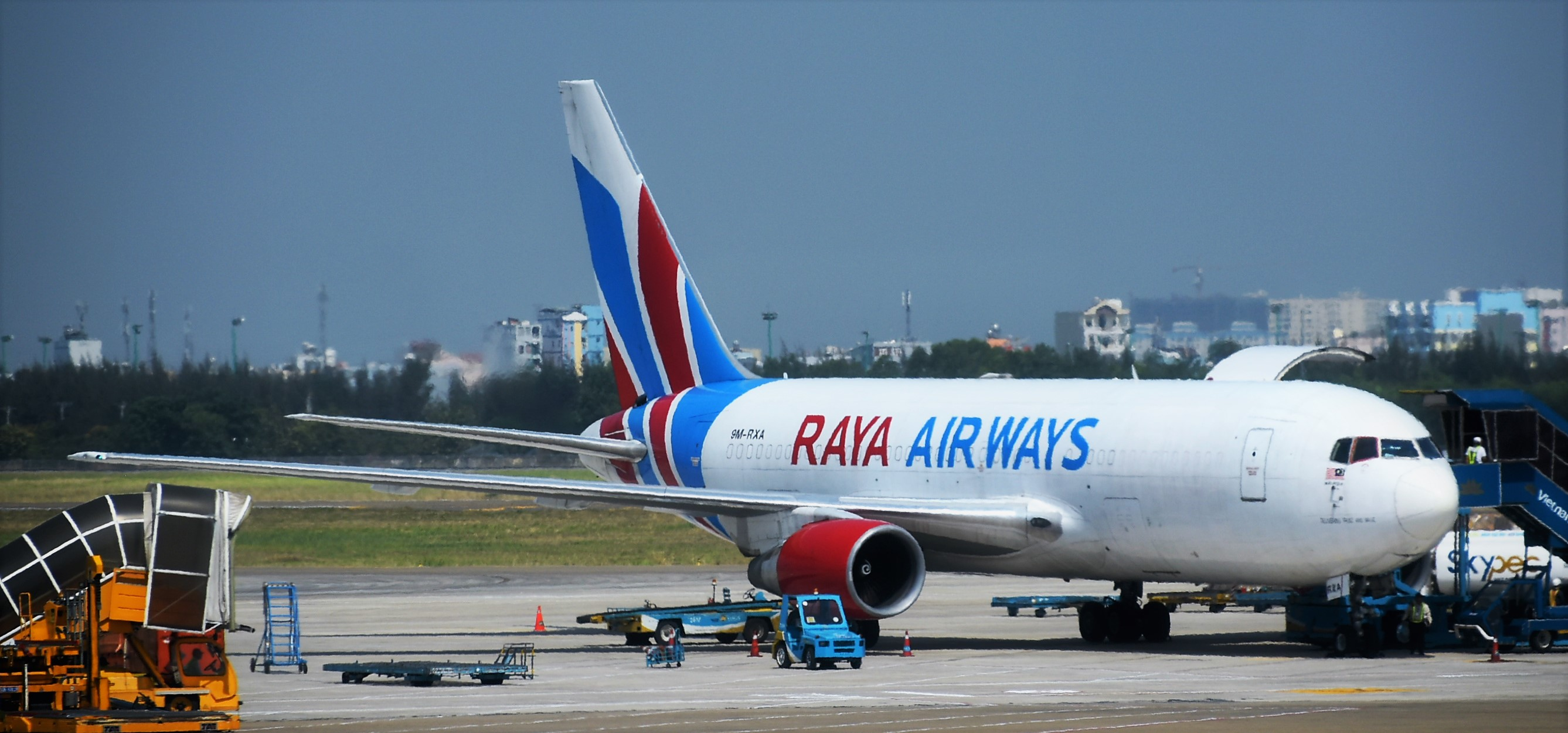
Former Raya Airways Boeing 767-200

Country	City	Airport	Notes	Refs
China	Nanning	Nanning Wuxu International Airport		
Malaysia	Kota Kinabalu	Kota Kinabalu International Airport		
Malaysia	Kuala Lumpur	Sultan Abdul Aziz Shah Airport	Hub	
Malaysia	Kuala Lumpur	Kuala Lumpur International Airport	Hub	
Malaysia	Kuching	Kuching International Airport		
Malaysia	Labuan	Labuan Airport		
Malaysia	Tawau	Tawau Airport		
Hong Kong	Hong Kong	Hong Kong International Airport		
Indonesia	Jakarta	Soekarno-Hatta International Airport		
Singapore	Singapore	Changi Airport		
Vietnam	Ho Chi Minh City	Tan Son Nhat International Airport		

== Fleet ==
=== Current fleet ===
As of July 2026, Raya Airways operates the following aircraft:

Raya Airways fleet
Aircraft	In service	Orders	Notes
Airbus A321-200P2F	1		First freighter variant operator in Southeast Asia
Airbus A321-200PCF	2	—	
Boeing 767-200BDSF	1	—	
Boeing 767-200SF	4	—	
Total	8		

=== Former fleet ===
As of August 2025, Raya Airways operated 1 Airbus A321P2F, 2 Airbus A321PCF, 5 Boeing 767-200BDSF and 1 Boeing 767-300F (first freighter variant operator in Southeast Asia).

Raya Airways also previously operated the following aircraft:

- 1 Boeing 737-400SF

As Transmile Air Services, the airline formerly operated the following aircraft:

Raya Airways former fleet
Aircraft	Total	Introduced	Retired	Notes
Boeing 727-200F	12	1996	2015	
Boeing 737-200F	9	1994	2014	
Boeing 757-200PCF	1	2015	2020	
Cessna 208B Grand Caravan	6	1995	2008	
McDonnell Douglas DC-10-30	2	1998	1998	Leased from Laker Airways
McDonnell Douglas MD-11F	4	2005	2011	

== See also ==
- List of airlines of Malaysia
