= Tioman Airport =

Airport in Rompin, Pahang, Malaysia

Tioman Airport Lapangan Terbang Tioman
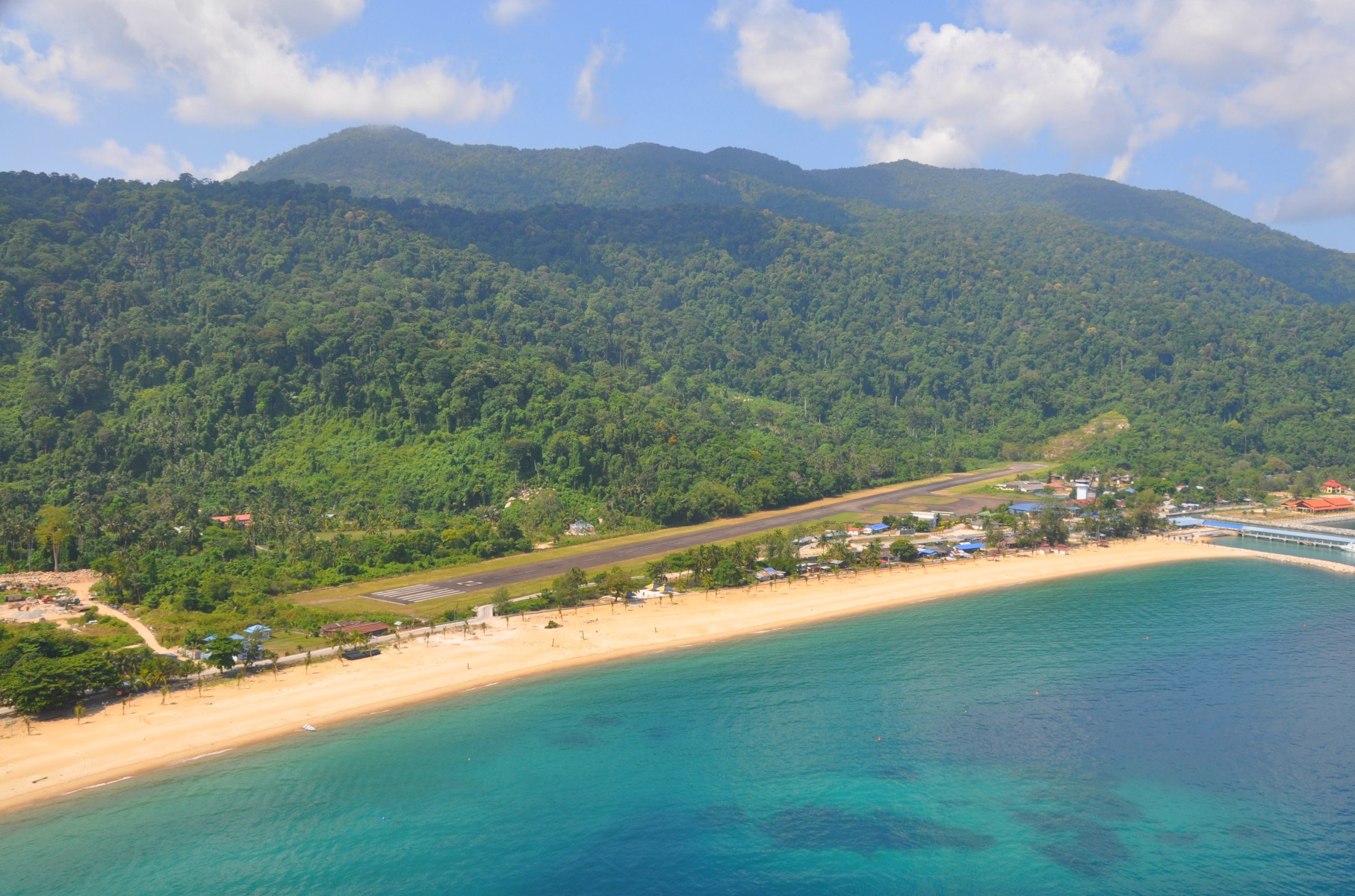
- The runway is only accessible from the north, due to the nearby hills at the south end
- IATA: TOD; ICAO: WMBT

Summary
- Airport type: Public
- Owner: Government of Malaysia
- Operator: Malaysia Airports Berhad
- Serves: Tioman Island
- Location: Rompin, Pahang, Malaysia
- Time zone: MST (UTC+08:00)
- Elevation AMSL: 13 ft (4.0 m)
- Coordinates: 02°49′09″N 104°09′36″E

Maps
- Pahang state in Malaysia

- Location in Tioman Island, West Malaysia TOD/WMBT (Malaysia) TOD/WMBT (Southeast Asia) TOD/WMBT (Asia)

Runways
Direction	Length		Surface
Direction	m	ft	Surface
02/20	992	3,255	Tarmac

Statistics (2013)
- Passengers: 56,054
- Passenger change 12-13: ▼6.8%
- Aircraft movements: 2,089
- Movements change 12-13: ▼5.3%
- Sources: AIP Malaysia

Tioman Airport (IATA: TOD, ICAO: WMBT), also known as Pulau Tioman Airport, is an airport serving Tioman Island, Pahang, Malaysia. It is located next to Tekek village (Kampung Tekek). The relatively small size of aircraft able to take off and land at Tioman means that per seat costs are relatively high, making it hard for airlines operating out of the island to remain profitable. The airport's runway is "one way" as planes can only land and take off in one direction (north) due to nearby terrain. Tioman is a popular destination for private pilots based in Singapore and Malaysia, as it is only a little more than an hour away by air from Seletar Airport, Singapore compared to over 5 hours by surface transport.

== History ==
An improvement project of the airport, which cost RM35.87 million, was planned to be completed by November 1996. The project include an expansion of the runway and installation of advanced equipment.

Berjaya Air operated regular flights from Singapore-Seletar and Kuala Lumpur-Subang until 2014. There has been no scheduled service since.

== Traffic and statistics ==
Annual passenger numbers and aircraft statistics
Year	Passengers handled	Passenger % change	Cargo (tonnes)	Cargo % change	Aircraft movements	Aircraft % change
2003	56,900	Steady	2,633	Steady	0	Steady
2004	57,957	▲1.8	2,447	▼7.1	0	Steady
2005	54,054	▼6.7	2,146	▼12.3	0	Steady
2006	57,559	▲6.5	2,256	▲5.1	0	Steady
2007	46,260	▼19.6	1,989	▼11.8	0	Steady
2008	48,767	▲5.4	2,141	▲7.6	0	Steady
2009	49,057	▲0.6	2,180	▲1.8	0	Steady
2010	54,056	▲10.2	0	▼	0	Steady
2011	62,010	▲14.7	0	Steady	2,222	▲
2012	60,141	▼3.0	73	▲	2,205	▼0.8
2013	56,054	▼6.8	30	▼59.8	2,089	▼5.3
2014	9,217	▼83.6	15	▼50.0	1,019	▼51.2
2015	0	▼	0	▼	993	▼2.6
2016	0	Steady	0	Steady	733	▼26.2
2017	0	Steady	0	Steady	636	▼13.2
2018	0	Steady	0	Steady	470	▼26.1
2019	0	Steady	0	Steady	339	▼27.9
2020	0	Steady	0	Steady	132	▼61.1
^{Source: Malaysia Airports Holdings Berhad}

=== Statistics ===
Busiest flights out of Tioman Airport by frequency
Rank	Destinations	Frequency (weekly)
1	Selangor, Subang (SZB)	5
