= Berjaya Air =

Regional airline of Malaysia

Berjaya Air Sdn Bhd
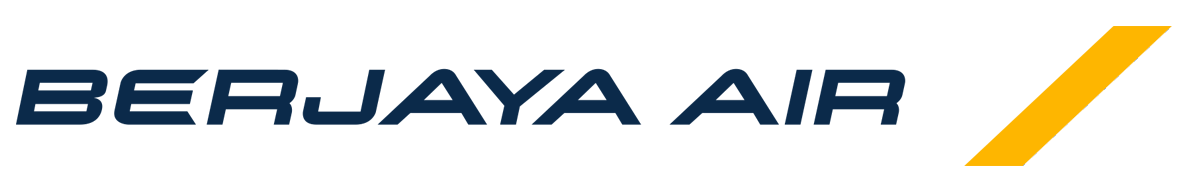

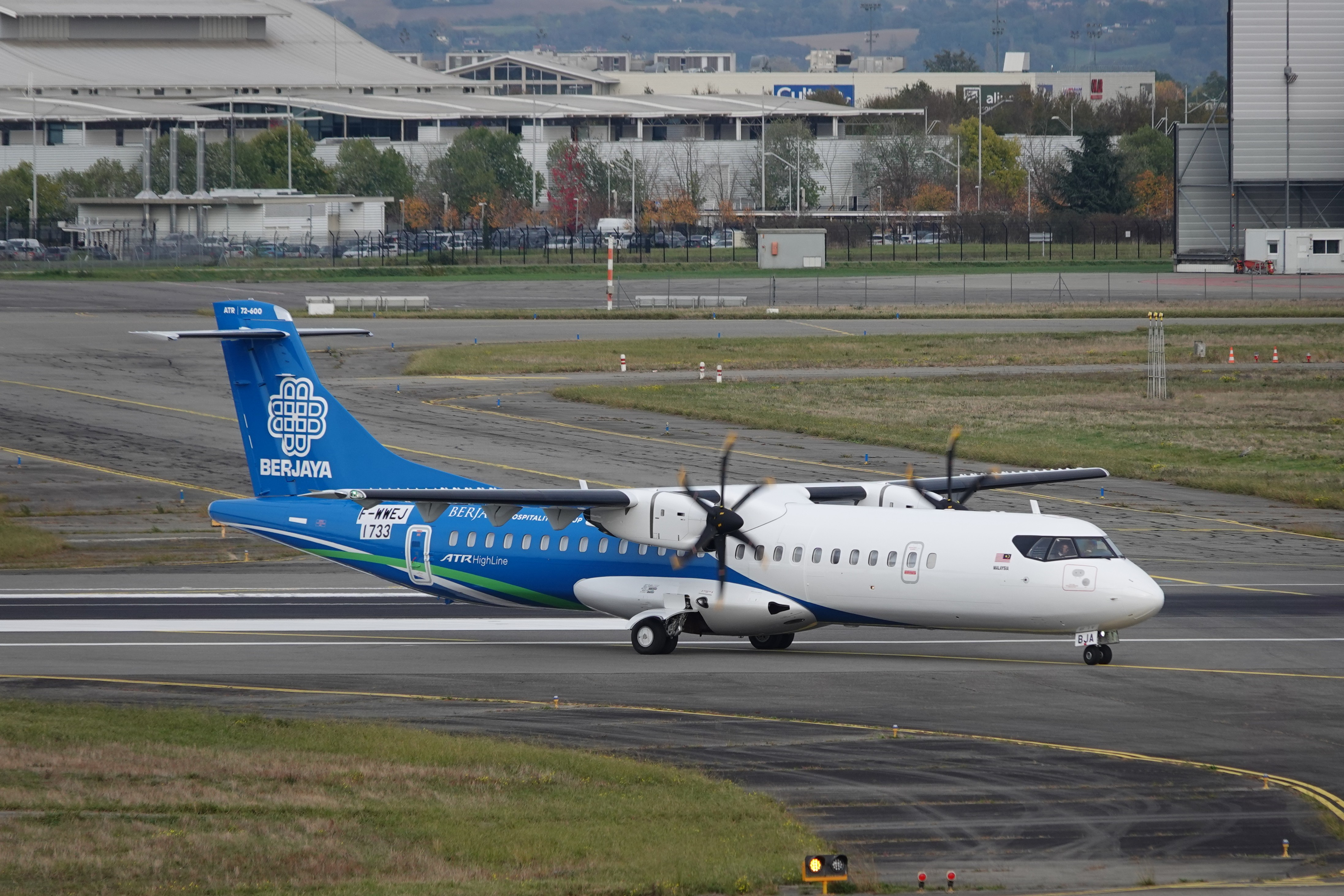
- ATR HighLine of Berjaya Air
IATA	ICAO	Call sign
J8	BVT	BERJAYA
- Founded: 15 August 1989; 37 years ago (as Pacific Air Charter)
- Operating bases: Sultan Abdul Aziz Shah Airport
- Fleet size: 6
- Destinations: 3
- Parent company: Berjaya Corporation Group of Companies
- Headquarters: Sultan Abdul Aziz Shah Airport, Subang, Malaysia
- Key people: Tan Sri Vincent Tan Chee Yioun (CEO); Datuk Ronnei Tan (COO); Joseph Tan (DCO Property)
- Website: www.berjaya-air.com

Berjaya Air is a Malaysian airline headquartered at Sultan Abdul Aziz Shah Airport in Subang, Selangor, Malaysia. Established on 15 August 1989 as Pacific Air Charter, it is a subsidiary of the Berjaya Corporation group.

The airline specialises in charter and regional air services, with a focus on connecting travellers to island destinations, resorts and other leisure destinations in Malaysia and the surrounding region. Its operations include private and public charter services, using aircraft such as the ATR 72 series, with its main operating base at Subang SkyPark Terminal.

== History ==
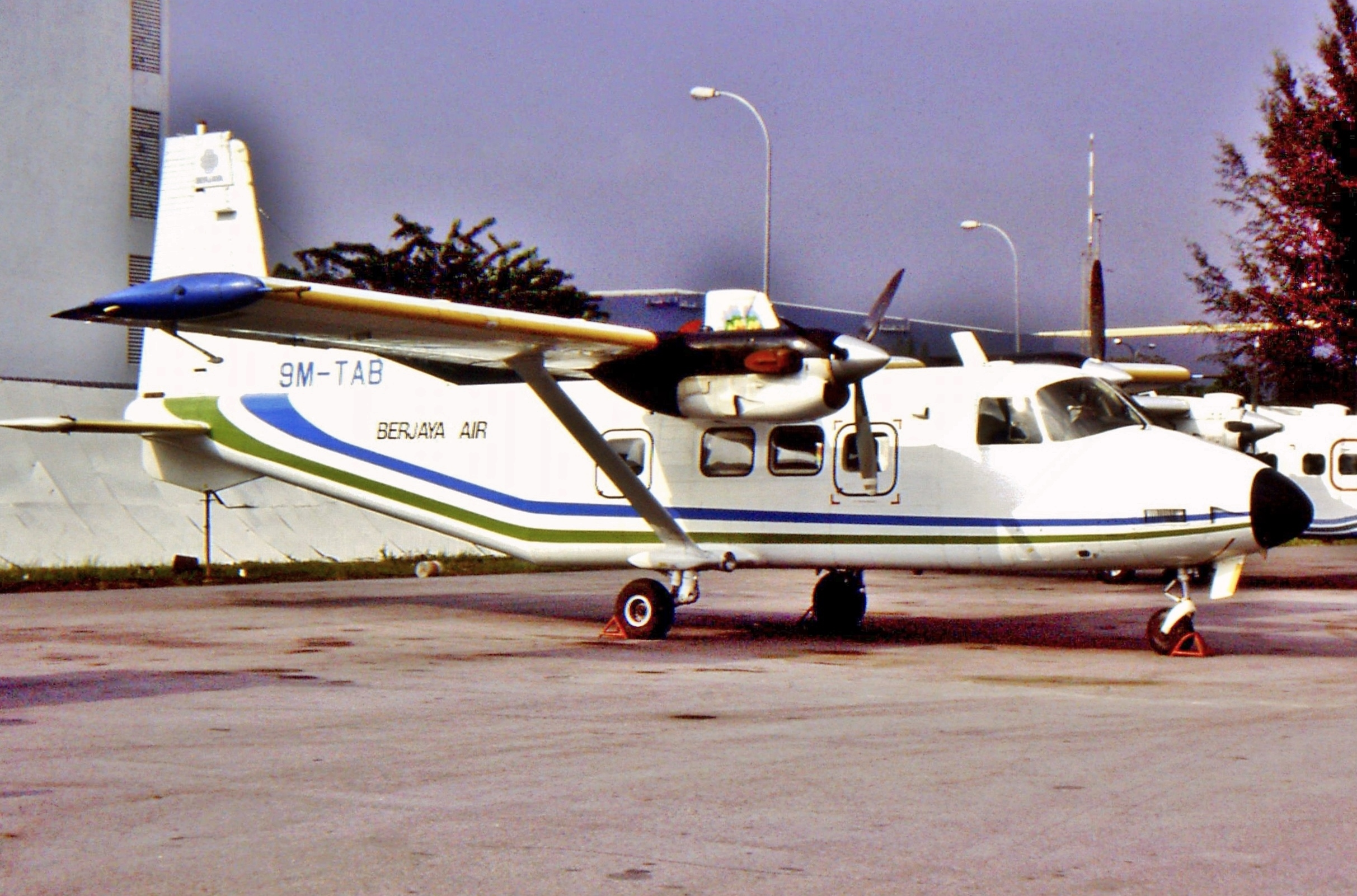
Berjaya Air Harbin Y-12

=== 1989–1999: Establishment and early operations ===
Berjaya Air was founded in 1989 as Pacific Air Charter Sdn Bhd and began operations on 30 June that year as a charter operator. Based at Sultan Abdul Aziz Shah Airport in Subang, Selangor, the airline was established by the Berjaya Group and adopted the Berjaya Air name later that year.

Berjaya Air initially focused on domestic services to resort islands, including Tioman and Redang, from Subang. During the 1990s, it operated de Havilland Canada DHC-7 Dash 7 aircraft on these routes. The aircraft were suited to island destinations such as Tioman, whose airport has a relatively short runway. The airline also operated charter flights alongside its scheduled services.

=== 2000–2014: Network growth and ATR introduction ===
In December 2007, Berjaya Air placed an order for four ATR 72-500 aircraft, configured with 72 seats each, valued at approximately US$74 million. Deliveries were scheduled between 2009 and 2010, with the first aircraft entering service in 2009 to operate alongside the airline's remaining Dash 7 fleet.

With the updated fleet, Berjaya Air grew its network in the early 2010s. Domestic routes were extended to Kota Bharu and Penang, while international flights connected passengers to Singapore and Hua Hin, Thailand.

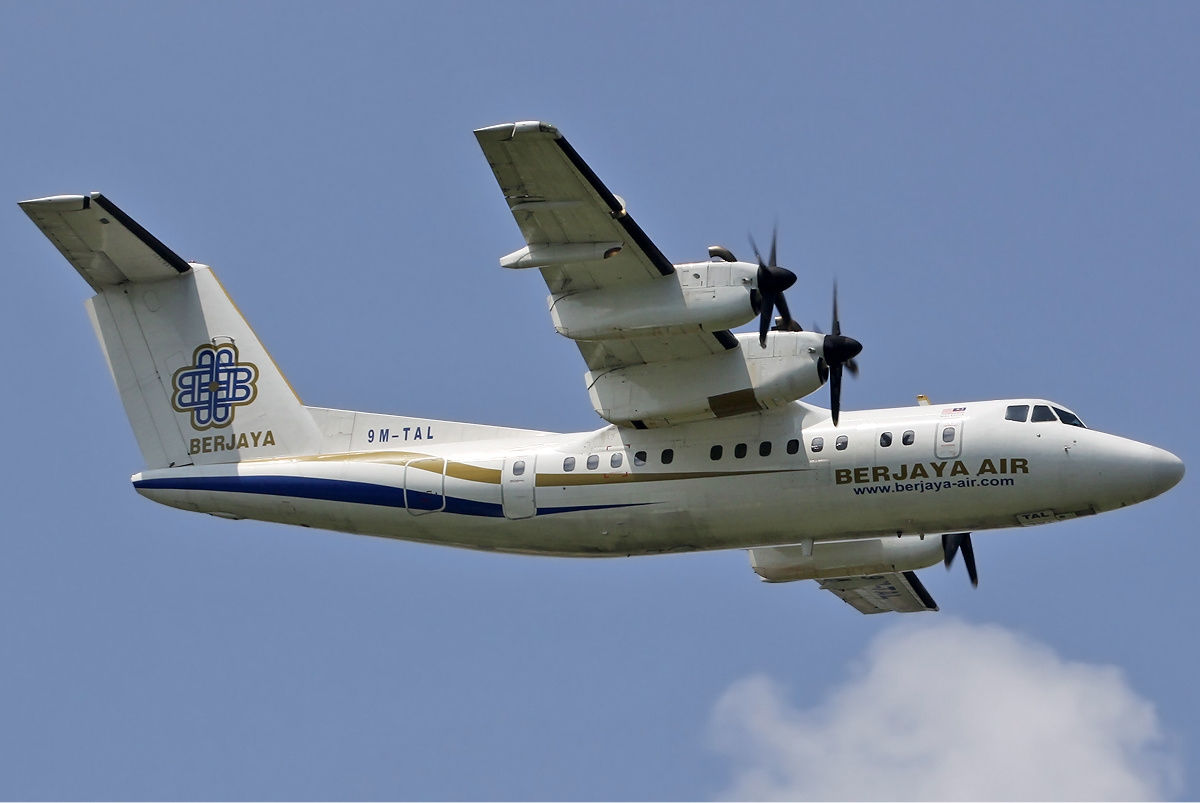
Berjaya Air de Havilland Canada Dash 7-100

=== 2014–2017: Reduction of scheduled operations ===
In 2014, Berjaya Air scaled back its scheduled network. Services to Tioman from Subang and Singapore were suspended, briefly resuming on 1 June 2014 after a two-month interruption before being permanently discontinued. As the airline progressively phased out its DHC-7 Dash 7 fleet, the ATR 72-500 became the principal aircraft type for its remaining scheduled routes.

By the mid-2010s, scheduled operations were significantly reduced compared to the previous decade, though charter flights and services supporting Berjaya Hotels and Resorts properties continued. By 2017, the airline maintained its base at Subang with an ATR 72 fleet, later resuming regular resort operations with the reintroduction of flights to Redang.

=== 2018–2022: Resort services and the COVID-19 pandemic ===
In February 2018, Berjaya Hotels & Resorts announced the acquisition of two ATR 42-500 aircraft for Berjaya Air. The aircraft were intended for flights to Redang Island from Subang and Singapore, as well as charter and group travel. The ATR 42-500 subsequently entered service with the airline, alongside its existing ATR 72 fleet.

On 20 February 2020, Berjaya Air introduced scheduled flights from Sultan Abdul Aziz Shah Airport to Redang Airport, primarily serving guests of The Taaras Beach & Spa Resort. The aircraft assigned to the route was named Jojo and featured a sea turtle-themed livery. The service was suspended in March 2020 following the introduction of movement restrictions in Malaysia in response to the COVID-19 pandemic. It resumed under the Recovery Movement Control Order, with daily flights from Subang to Redang scheduled from 10 June. In August, Jojo completed its 100th landing at Redang Airport.

Further movement restrictions affected the airline's operations during late 2020 and 2021, with scheduled flying reduced while charter operations continued. By 2022, Berjaya Air was operating a smaller network centred on services associated with Berjaya Hotels & Resorts and charter flights.

=== 2023–present: Expansion and fleet renewal ===
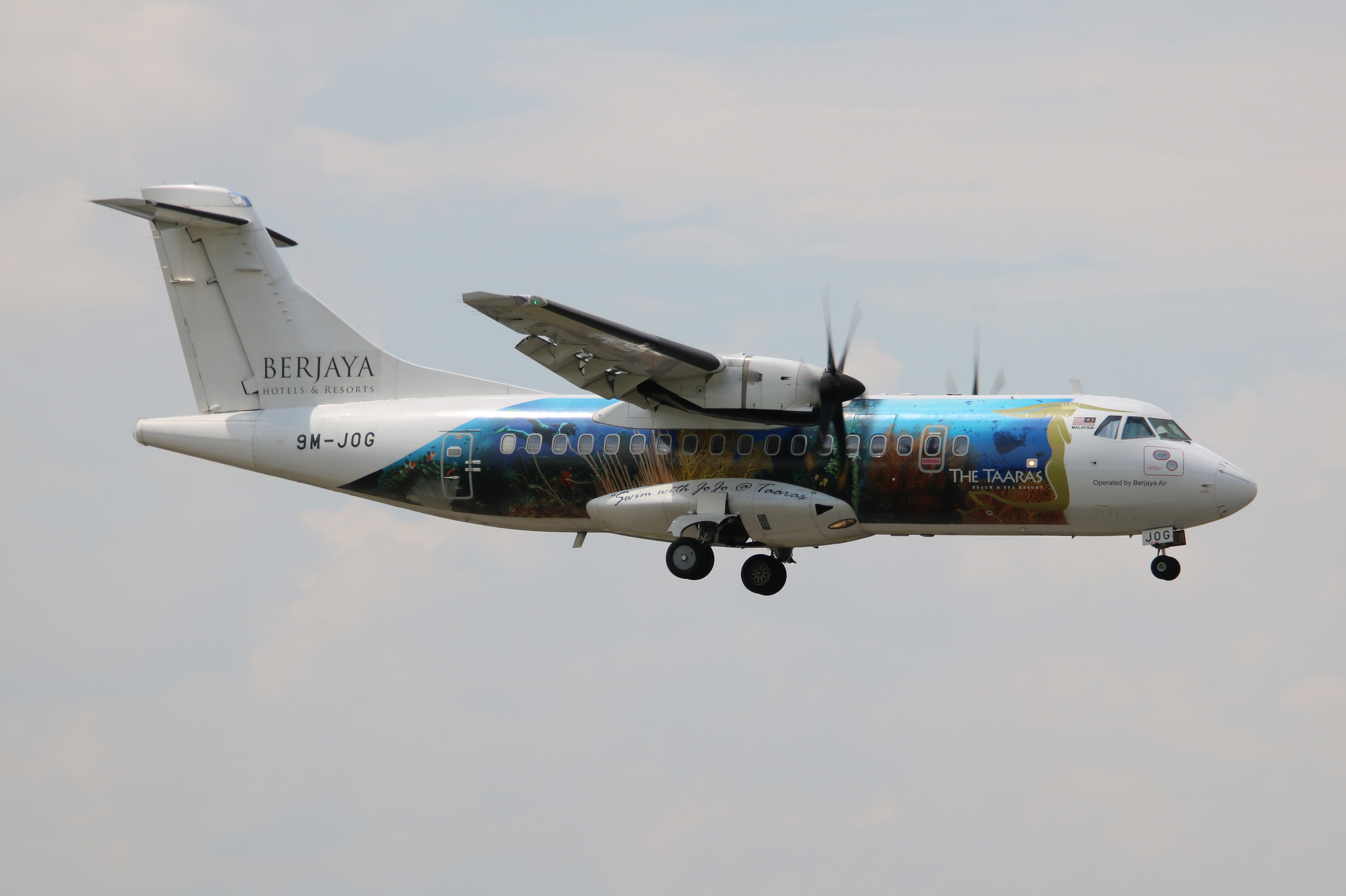
Berjaya Air ATR 72-500 display in The Taraas livery

In June 2023, Berjaya Air signed a heads of agreement with ATR for two ATR 72-600 aircraft. The aircraft were to be equipped with ATR's HighLine cabin, with 26 seats in an all-business-class 1–1 configuration. Berjaya Air was the launch customer for the HighLine configuration. The first aircraft was scheduled for delivery in 2025 and the second in 2026.

In December 2025, Berjaya Air unveiled its first ATR 72-600 and announced plans to expand its commercial flight network beginning 14 February 2026, introducing five new regional routes to Koh Samui in Thailand, Phú Quốc in Vietnam, and Medan, Pekanbaru and Batam in Indonesia as part of a broader move into regional markets across Southeast Asia.

The first ATR 72-600 was delivered to the airline on 20 May 2026. It was the first ATR 72-600 delivered with the HighLine cabin and the first aircraft of the type operated by Berjaya Air. The aircraft has 26 seats in a 1–1 configuration. The HighLine cabin received certification from the European Union Aviation Safety Agency and the Malaysian aviation authorities earlier that month.

Berjaya Air began operating the ATR 72-600 on scheduled services in 2026. The airline's announced destinations included Redang, Langkawi and Koh Samui, while flights between Subang and Singapore's Seletar Airport were announced for August 2026. The aircraft was also used for charter flights, including flights for private and corporate groups.

== Current destinations ==
As of October 2026, Berjaya Air operates to the following destinations:

Country	City	Airport	Notes	Refs
Malaysia	Kuala Lumpur	Sultan Abdul Aziz Shah Airport	Hub	
Malaysia	Redang	Redang Airport		
Singapore	Singapore	Seletar Airport		

== Fleet ==
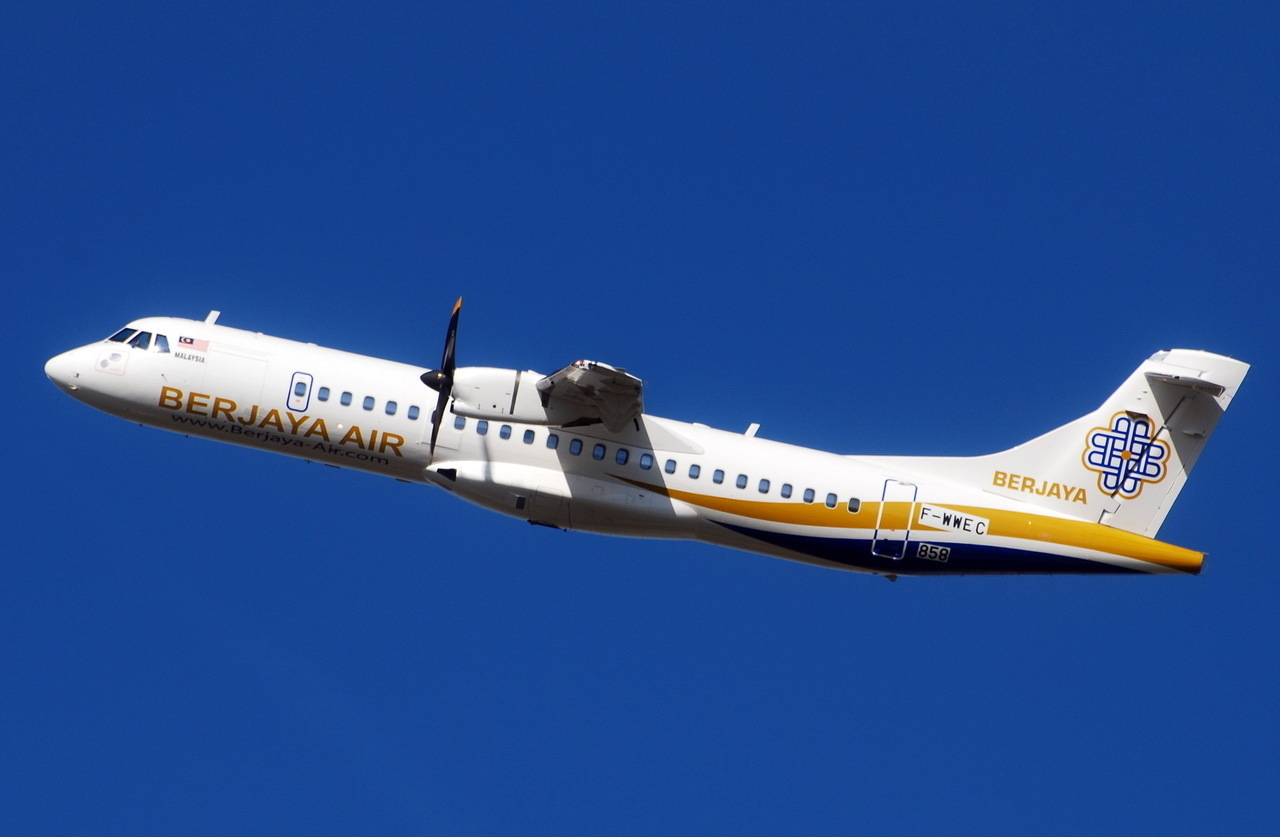
Berjaya Air ATR 72-500

=== Current fleet ===
As of October 2026, Berjaya Air operates the following aircraft:

Berjaya Air fleet
Aircraft	In service	Orders	Passengers	Notes
ATR 72-500	1	0	68	
ATR 72-600	1	1	26	Launch customer for the ATR HighLine; configured with all-business class seats

=== Fleet development ===
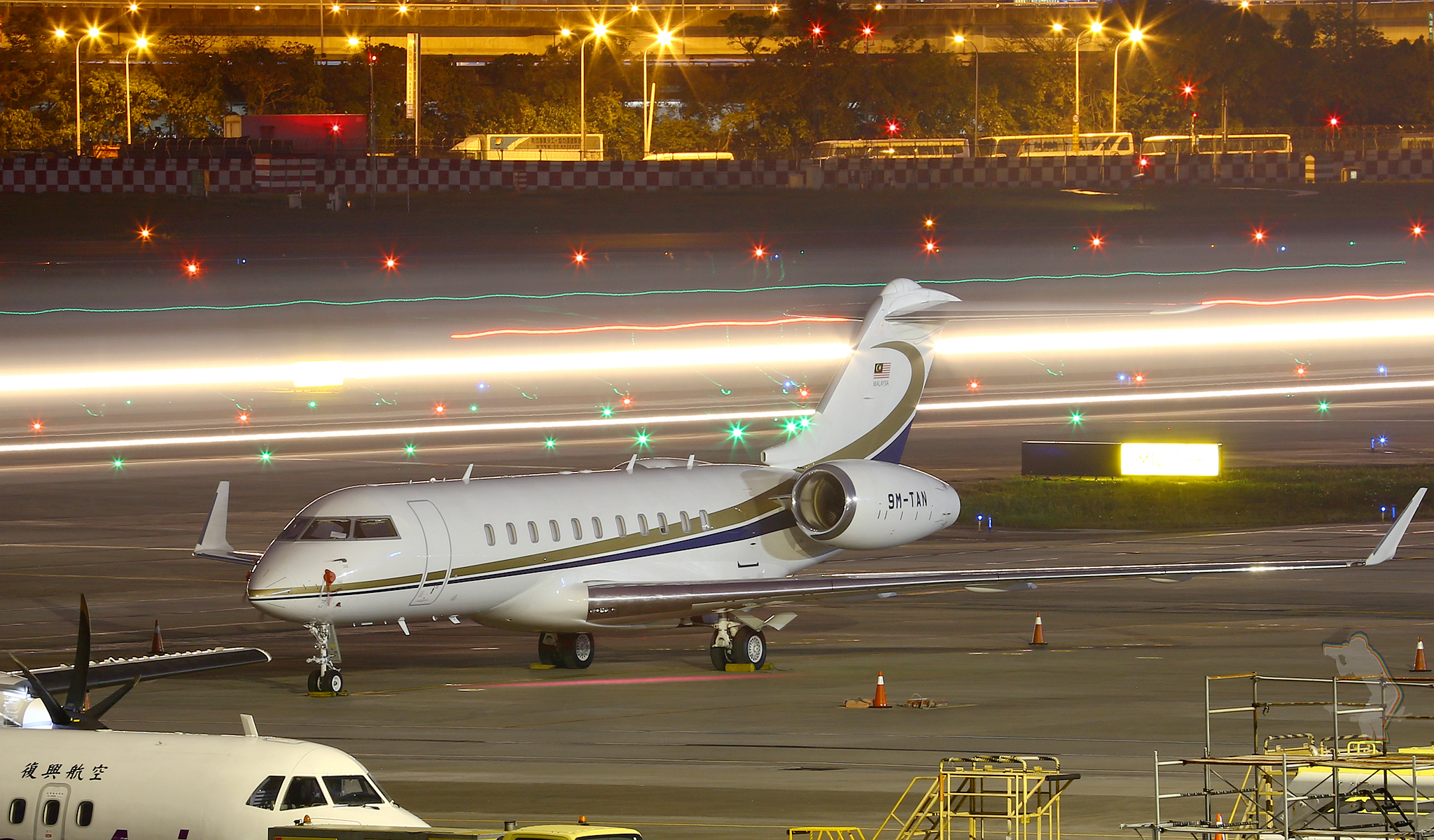
Berjaya Air Bombardier Global 5000

Berjaya Air operated 2 ATR 72-500s and 4 de Havilland Canada Dash 7-100 on several routes until 2014. The airline has since maintained its operator's certificate by keeping a Bombardier Challenger 300, which is used for charter flights.

The airline announced at the 2018 Singapore Airshow the purchase of two second-hand ATR 42-500s. The aircraft will be used to launch flights from Redang to Kuala Lumpur and Singapore.

Berjaya Air also ordered 2 ATR 72-600 in full business-class cabins at the 2023 Paris Air Show. With the first one arriving in February 2026 and another one set to arrive in October 2026.

In May 2025, the airline ordered and acquired a Bombardier Global 6500 in the same month. It became the first Global 6500 to be registered in Malaysia.

In May 2026, the airline ordered and acquired an ATR HighLine, which was the first such aircraft to be built and the aircraft's first customer.

=== Former fleet ===
Berjaya Air has previously operated the following aircraft:

- 2 ATR 72-500
- 2 Bell 206 Long Ranger
- 1 Bombardier Challenger 300
- 2 Britten-Norman BN-2 Islander
- 1 Cessna Citation II
- 4 de Havilland Canada Dash 7-100
- 2 Harbin Y-12

== Accidents and incidents ==
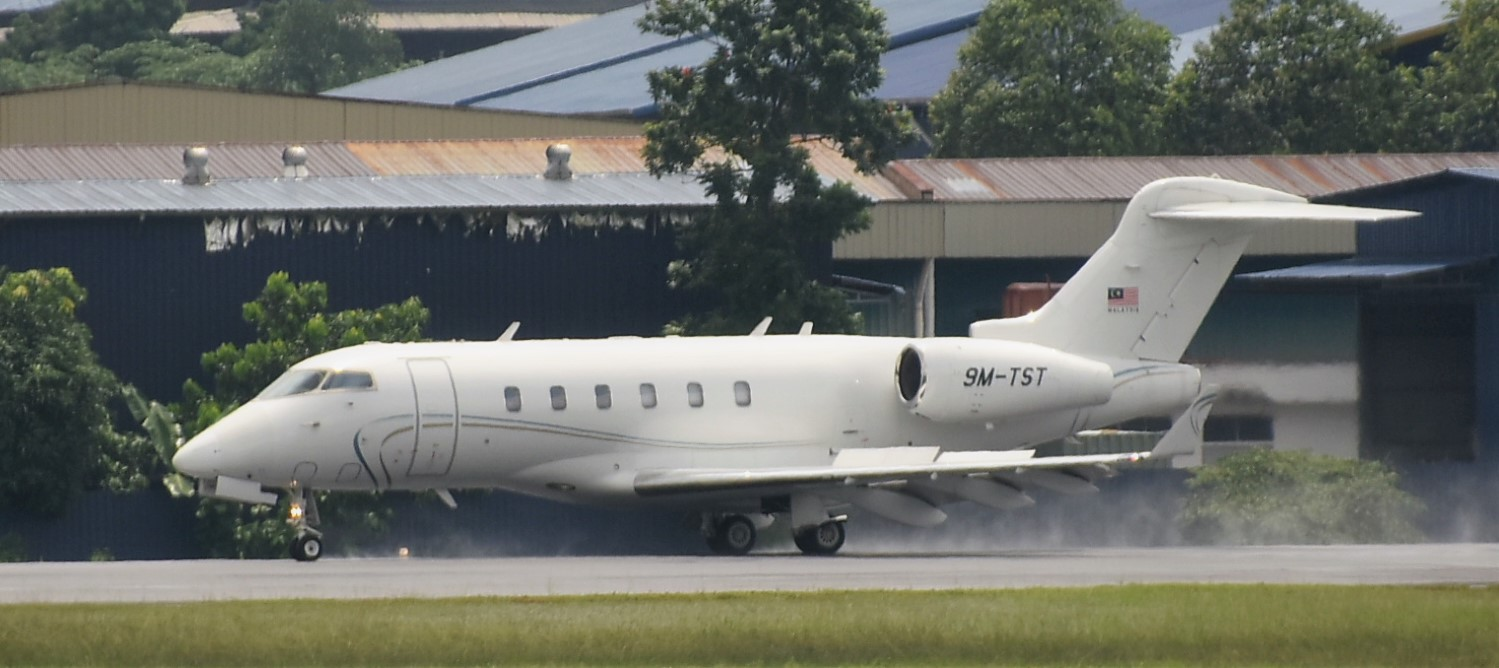
The Challenger involved, seen in 2017

- On 2 February 1995, a Harbin Y-12-II (9M-TAE) from Tioman to Subang collided with a parked Pelangi Air Dornier 228-202K (9M-PEL) during taxiing, 19 occupants were safe without injury and the aircraft was written off. Initial report suggested it was a hydraulic brake fault.
- On 18 March 2019, one ground worker died after being struck by a Bombardier Challenger 300 (9M-TST) on a charter flight from Subang to Jaipur, the left wing went severed damaged and was later written off.
