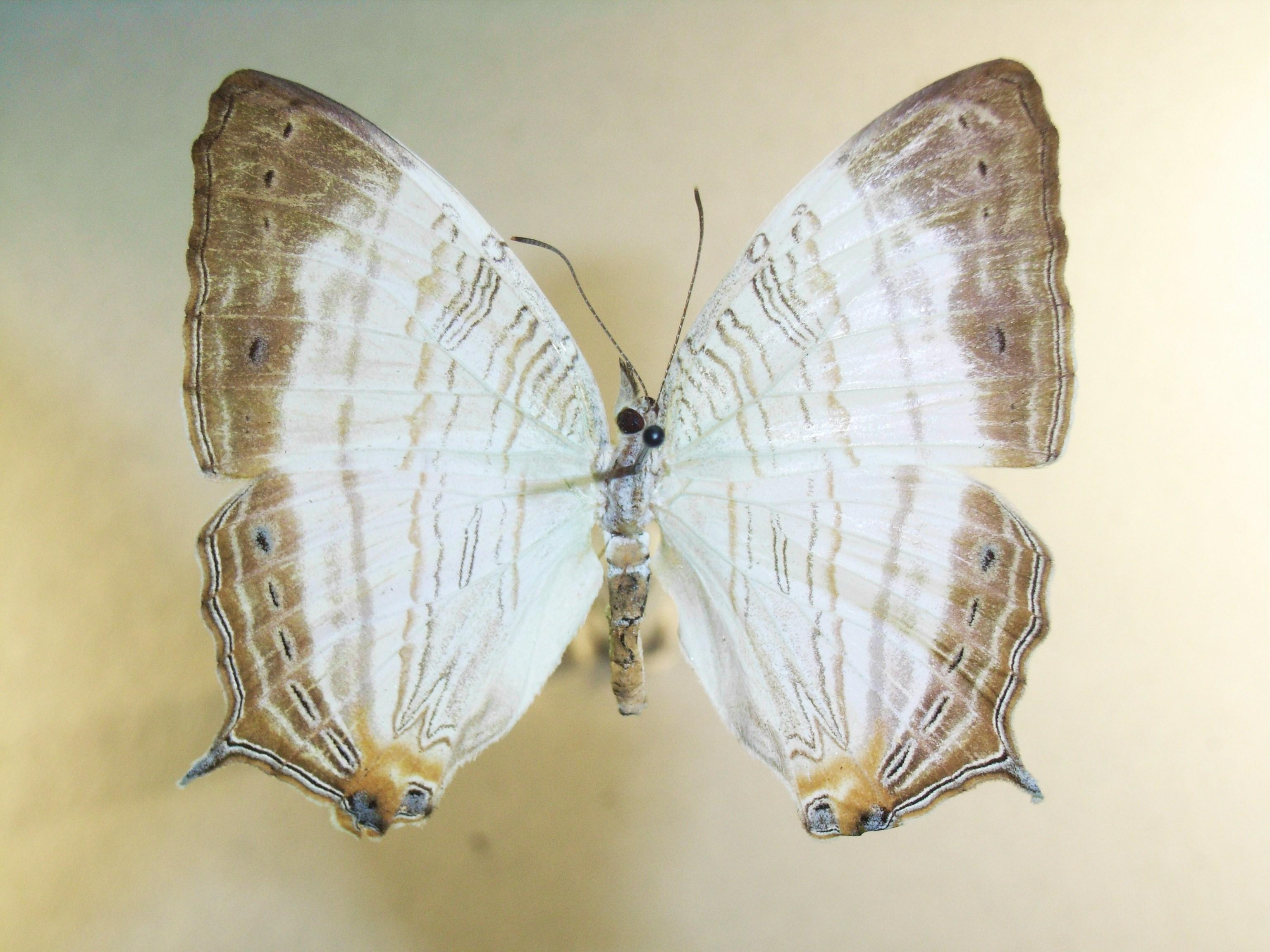

Scientific classification
- Kingdom: Animalia
- Phylum: Arthropoda
- Class: Insecta
- Order: Lepidoptera
- Family: Nymphalidae
- Genus: Cyrestis
- Species: C. cassander

Binomial name
- Cyrestis cassander C. & R. Felder, 1863

= Cyrestis cassander =

Species of butterfly

Cyrestis cassander is an Indomalayan butterfly of the family Nymphalidae. It is endemic to the Philippines.

== Description ==
C. cassander which replaces cocles in the Philippines is in the female practically identical with it, but presents in the male considerable differences. One might be tempted to unite this species with paulinus, were it not for the fact, that paulinus has in all its forms on both wings quite distinct round ocelli, whereas cassander and its subspecies have in their place a numberof black, white-bordered streaks, which cannot even be called lunules being not at all curved. Moreover, cassander has, analogous to the periander-group, the apex of the forewing obtusely cut off, whereas in paulinus it is more rounded.

== Subspecies ==
- Cyrestis cassander cassander C.& R.Felder, 1863 (Batanes, Luzon, Marinduque, Mindoro)
- Cyrestis cassander dacebalus Fruhstorfer, 1912 (Balabac, Camotes, Dinagat, Guimaras, Leyte, Samar)
- Cyrestis cassander orchomenus Fruhstorfer, 1912 (Basilan, Mindanao)
- Cyrestis cassander thessa Fruhstorfer, 1889 (Balabac, Calamian group, Palawan)

== Taxonomy ==
The species is often listed as C. p. cassander, a subspecies of Cyrestis paulinus.
