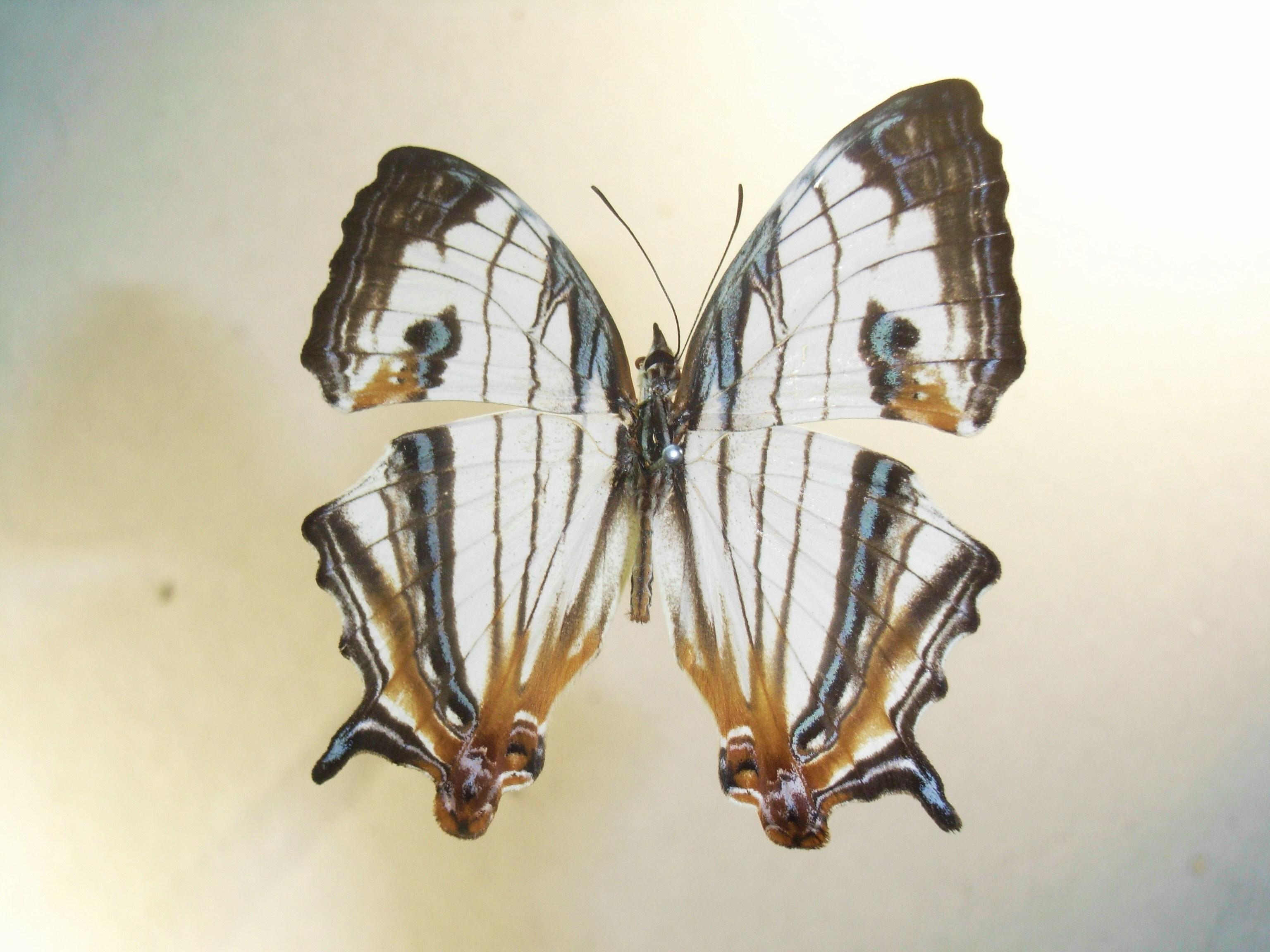

Scientific classification
- Domain: Eukaryota
- Kingdom: Animalia
- Phylum: Arthropoda
- Class: Insecta
- Order: Lepidoptera
- Family: Nymphalidae
- Genus: Cyrestis
- Species: C. achates

Binomial name
- Cyrestis achates Butler, 1865

Synonyms
- Cyrestis nedymnus C. & R. Felder, 1865

= Cyrestis achates =

Species of butterfly

Cyrestis achates is a butterfly of the family Nymphalidae. It is found in south-east Asia.

== Description ==
The meridional stripes are complete and rather heavy, more so than in thyodamas and nais; the first and second consist, when they start at the costa of the forewings, of two branches having their interspaces delicately laved with pale blue; in no other Cyrestis form we find so much blue along the costa in the basal half; also the submarginal band is on either wing most profusely marked with blue. The chain-pattern is so indistinct, that we can barely recognize the two links at the anal extremity of the submarginal band on the hindwings. The innermost meridional stripe does not reach on the hindwing the anal margin, but ends shortly beyond the median vein; but the first median nervule being obscured with black appears like the continuation of the meridional stripe. The females are larger and paler and have the tails longer.

== Biology ==
The larvae feed on Ficus species. They feed in large groups.

== Subspecies ==
- Cyrestis achates achates (Aru to West Irian to Papua and Goodenough Island)
- Cyrestis achates bougainvillei Ribbe (Bougainville, Guadalcanal, Santa Isabel)
- Cyrestis achates whitmei Butler (Loyalty Islands, New Caledonia)
