= C. c. elegans =

C. c. elegans may refer to:

- Camponotus claripes elegans, an ant subspecies in the genus Camponotus
- Cyrestis camillus elegans, a butterfly subspecies found in Madagascar

== See also ==
- C. elegans (disambiguation)
