= Pulau Tulai =

Island in Malaysia

Pulau Tulai, also known as Coral Island, is an uninhabited island in Malaysia. It is located in the South China Sea.

== Geography ==
The island is located eight nautical miles away from the west coast of Tioman Island. It is neighbouring the Batu Malang rocks, located to the south of Pulau Tulai.

On the east coast, the island borders Genting Bay. Pulau Tulai is part of the Pahang Marine Park, an area located two nautical miles from the lowest sea level and zoned for a distance of one nautical mile from that level.

== Fauna ==
The island has been a subject of biological surveys. Nine species of birds were found on Pulau Tulai, such as Todirhamphus chloris, Treron vernans, Ducula bicolor. Seven species of butterflies were found on the island, such as Cupha erymanthis, Ideopsis juventa, and Cyrestis themire.
