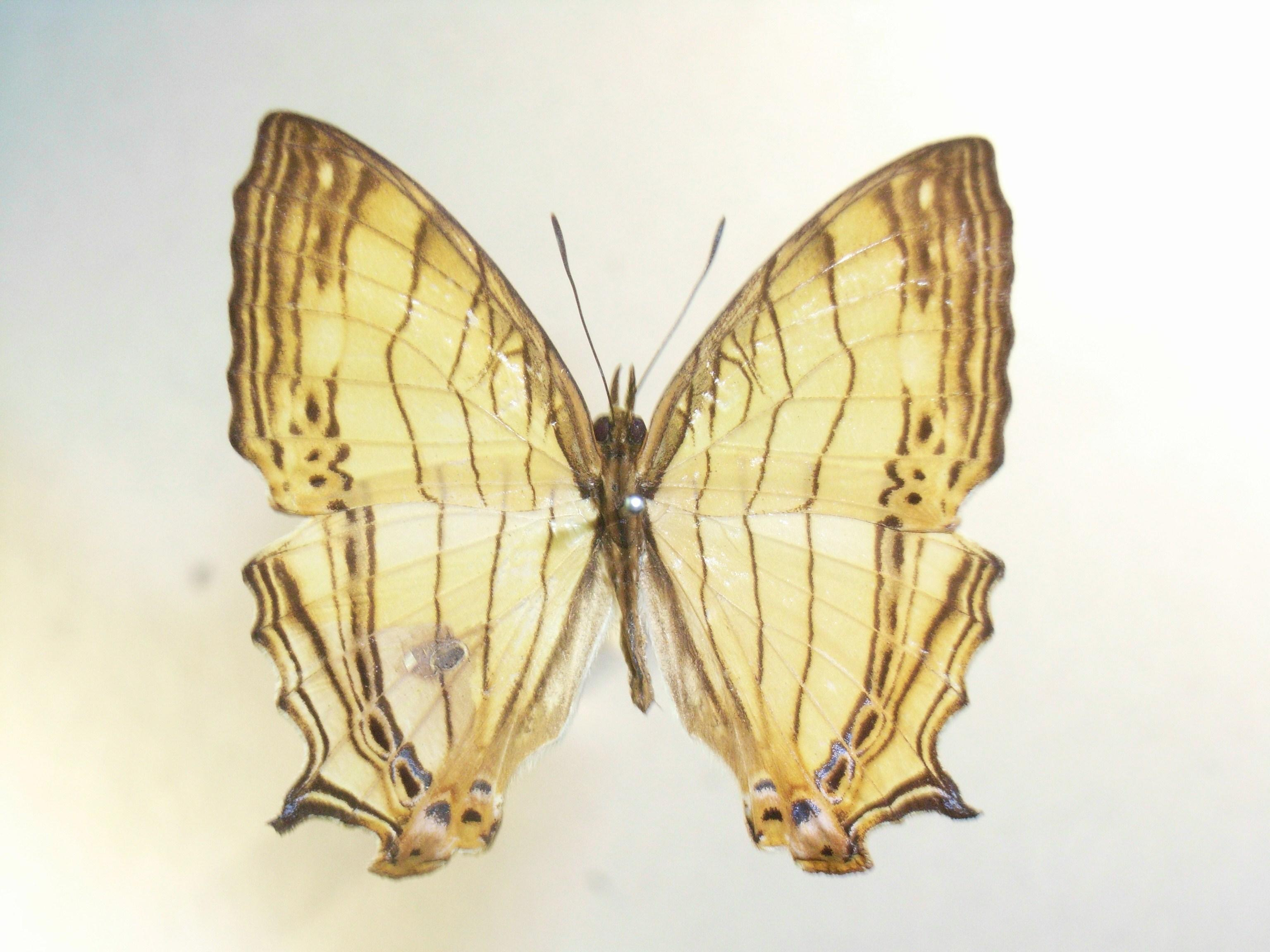

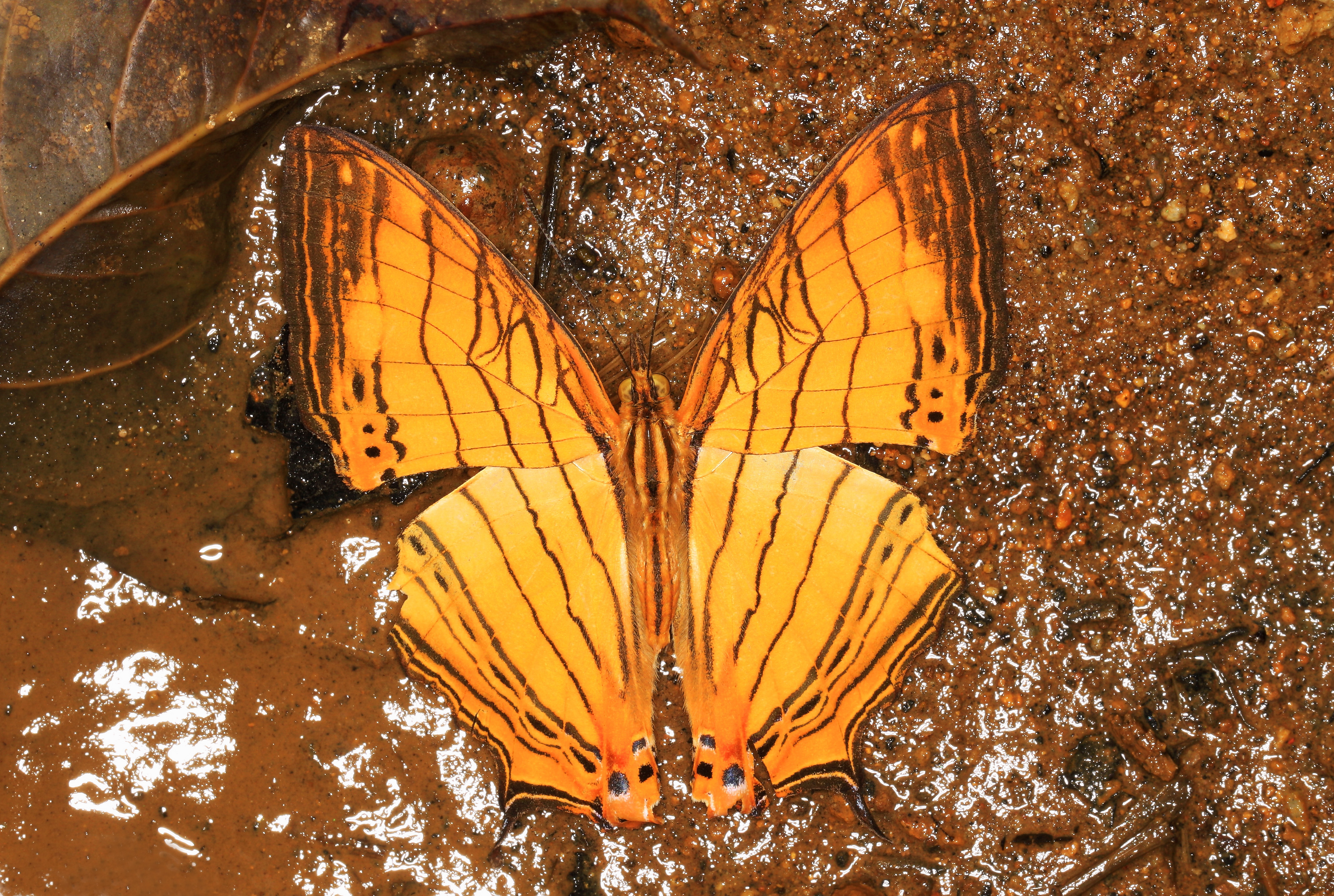

Scientific classification
- Domain: Eukaryota
- Kingdom: Animalia
- Phylum: Arthropoda
- Class: Insecta
- Order: Lepidoptera
- Family: Nymphalidae
- Genus: Cyrestis
- Species: C. lutea

Binomial name
- Cyrestis lutea (Zinken, 1831)

Synonyms
- Amathusia lutea Zinken, 1831

= Cyrestis lutea =

Species of butterfly

Cyrestis lutea, the orange straight-line map-wing or little map-wing, is a butterfly of the family Nymphalidae. It is found in Indonesia.

== Description ==
The meridional stripes are, as in the white species [of Cyrestis], very fine and equally far apart; on the hindwing the sub¬marginal band lacks the blue ornamental line, but contains at its anal end two distinct links of the chain-pattern; the yellow markings at the anal angle of both wings, though very plain, are not very conspicuous upon the ground colour. But the most striking characteristic of this species is the aberrative colouring of the female which is white, a phenomenon not observed in any otherspecies of Cyrestis. The white females which are so scarce, that Fruhstorfer captured in the course of many years only 2—3 specimens, are distinguished from male and female nivea by the less pure white colouring of both wings, the increased transparency of the apical portion of the forewing which is light grey, not brown-black, and finally by the fact, that the white ground-colour touches on the forewing the costal margin between the third or outer meridional stripe and the submarginal band. The position of the dark blue spots on the anal projections as well as the fact, that the middle line in the submarginal band on the hindwing is broken up into a few streaks, correspond to the markings of the males.

== Subspecies ==
- Cyrestis lutea lutea (Java)
- Cyrestis lutea doliones Fruhstorfer, 1912 (Bali)
