= Pulo Jehat =

Jehat Island
Native name: Pulau Jehat ڤولو جيهت
- Interactive map of Jehat Island

Geography
- Location: South China Sea
- Coordinates: 2°39′49″N 104°09′59″E
- Archipelago: Pahang

Administration
- Malaysia

Demographics
- Ethnic groups: Malay

Pulo Jehat is an island located in the Straits of Johor. The name means Wicked Island.

It is located south of Tioman Island. Heritiera littoralis can be found on the island.

In 1938, the British built three gun emplacements on the island to defend the straits. The island is the supposed resting place of a witch doctor named Merah, placed there because it was believed that his spirit could not cross water. Supposedly, any who disturb or disrespect his tomb are killed.

A Japanese kamikaze plane is supposed to have tried to destroy the emplacements, but crashed nearby in the sea.

The emplacements were abandoned at the end of the war and the island is now vacant. The waters nearby are a popular local dive site. There are some underwater caves also.

== Pulau Jahat Marine Park ==
Pulau Jahat Marine Park
- Location within Malaysia
- Location: Pulau Jahat, Malaysia
- Nearest city: Mukut
- Coordinates: 2°42′19″N 104°10′41″E
- Area: 45.20 km^{2} (17.45 sq mi)
- Established: 1994
- Governing body: Sabah Parks

A marine park was established in 1994.
