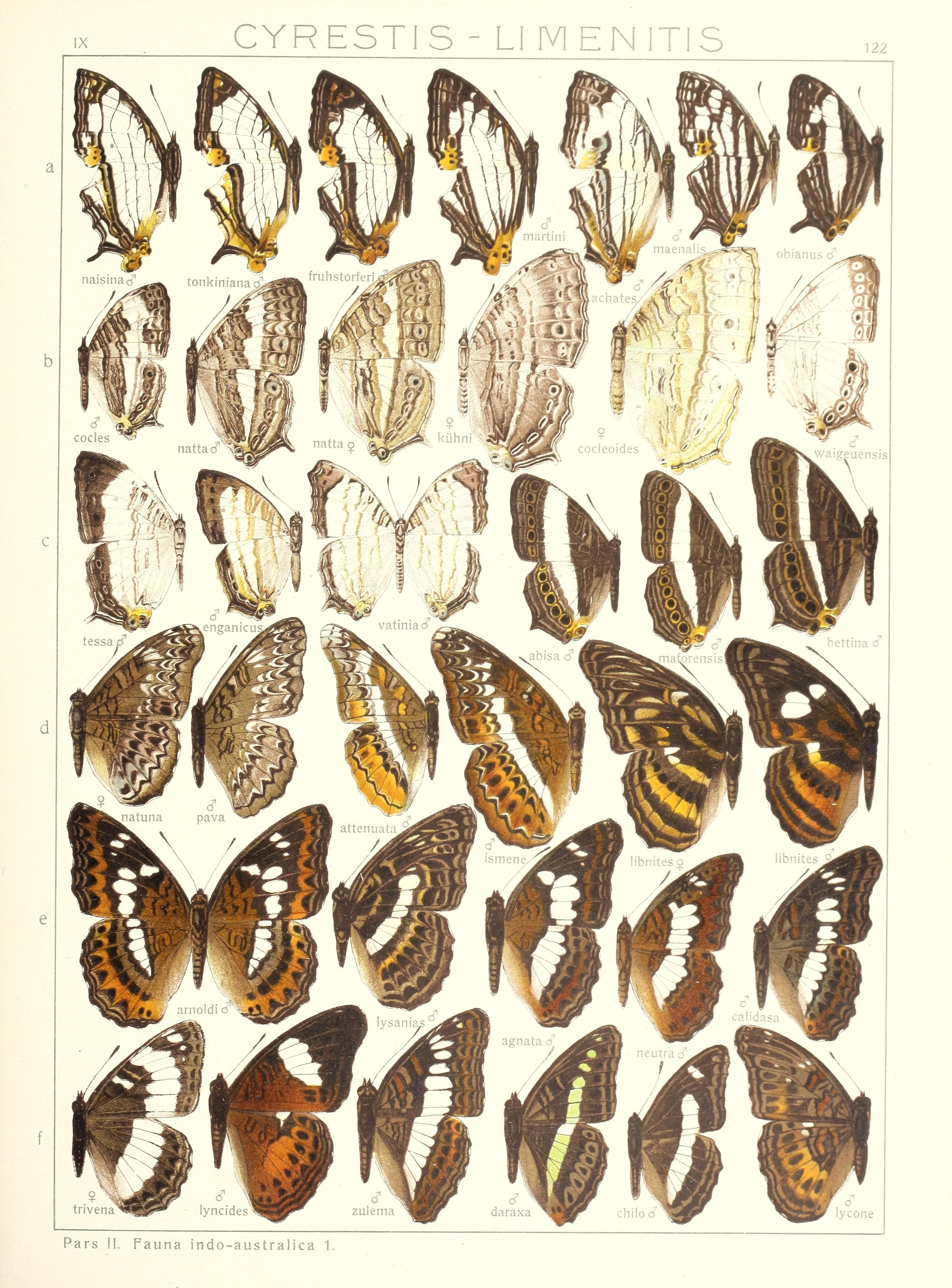
- Cyrestis telamon obianus in Seitz Die Großschmetterlinge der Erde 9 Die indo-australischen Tagfalter

Scientific classification
- Kingdom: Animalia
- Phylum: Arthropoda
- Class: Insecta
- Order: Lepidoptera
- Family: Nymphalidae
- Genus: Cyrestis
- Species: C. telamon

Binomial name
- Cyrestis telamon (Linnaeus, 1758)

= Cyrestis telamon =

Species of butterfly

Cyrestis telamon is a butterfly of the family Nymphalidae. It is found in Indonesia (Maluku Islands).

== Subspecies ==
- C. t. telamon Ambon, Serang
- C. t. obianus Martin, 1903 Obi
- C. t. obscuratus Martin, 1903 Bachan, Halmahera
- C. t. obscurissimus Martin, 1903 Morotai
