= Tioman Island =

Island in Malaysia

Native name: Pulau Tioman ڤولاو تياومن
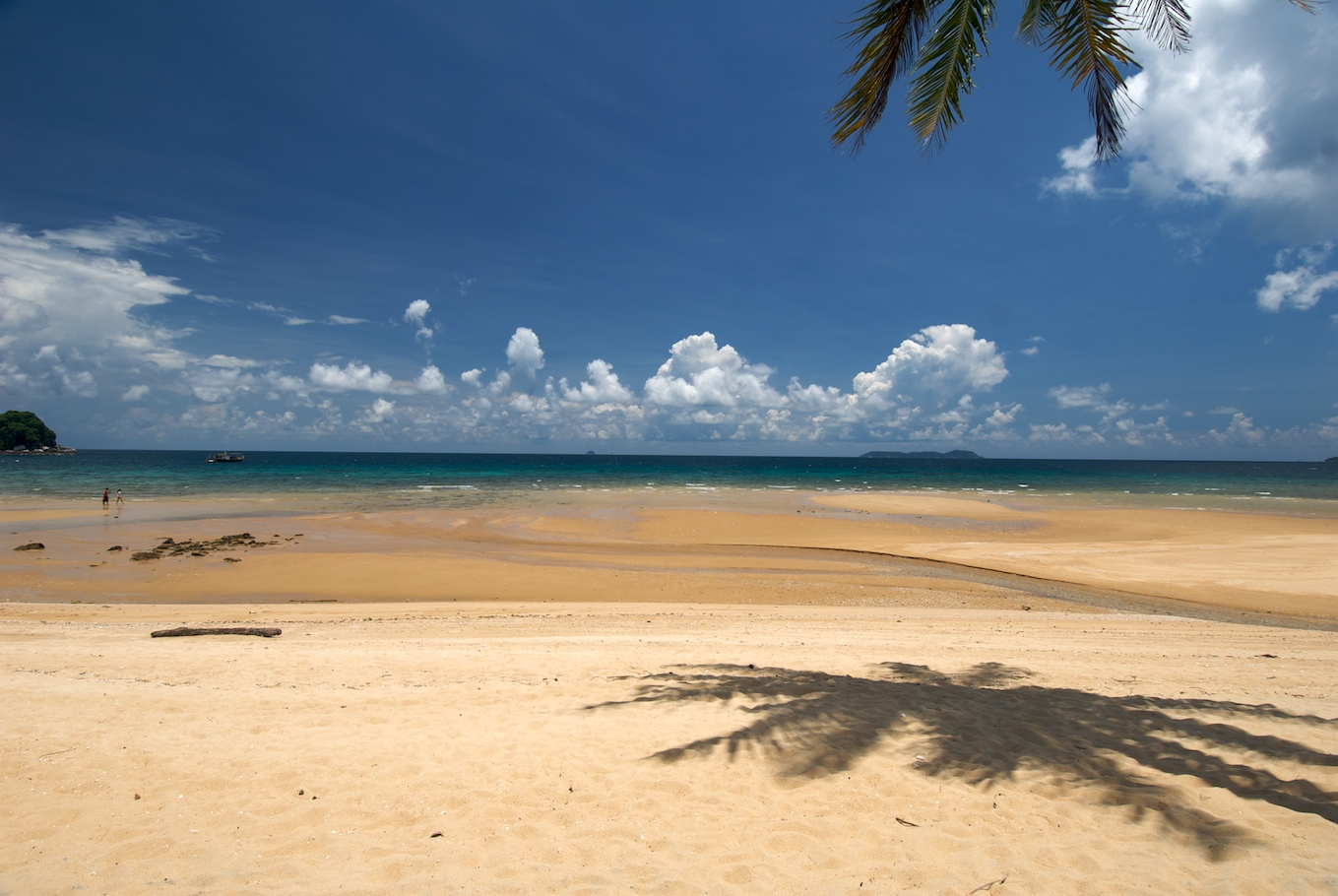
- Tioman Island

Geography
- Location: South China Sea
- Coordinates: 2°49′N 104°11′E
- Area: 136 km^{2} (53 sq mi)
- Coastline: 245 km (152.2 mi)
- Highest elevation: 1,038 m (3406 ft)
- Highest point: Gunung Kajang (Ribu)

Administration
- Malaysia
- State: Pahang
- District: Rompin

Demographics
- Population: 2023 (2016 Census)
- Ethnic groups: Malays and Chinese

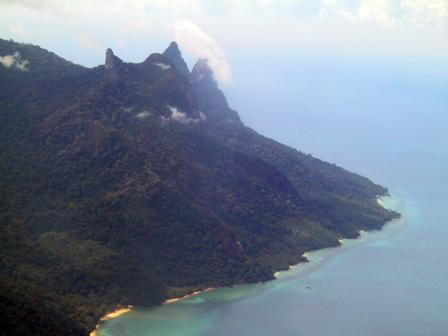
Tioman Island's southern mountains.

Tioman Island (Malay: Pulau Tioman) is 39 kilometres (24 miles), off the east coast of Peninsular Malaysia, more specifically off the east coast of Rompin District, Pahang, Malaysia. It is 20 kilometres (12 miles) long and 12 kilometres (7.5 miles) wide and has seven villages, the largest and most populous being Kampung Tekek on the central western coast. The densely forested island is sparsely inhabited, and is surrounded by numerous coral reefs, making it a popular scuba diving, snorkelling, and surfing spot. There are many resorts and chalets for tourists around the island, which has duty-free status.

The island is accessed via ferry service from the coastal town of Mersing and Teluk Gading, as well as by air, run by a regular private service from Sultan Abdul Aziz Shah Airport (formerly Subang International Airport) in Selangor.

== History ==
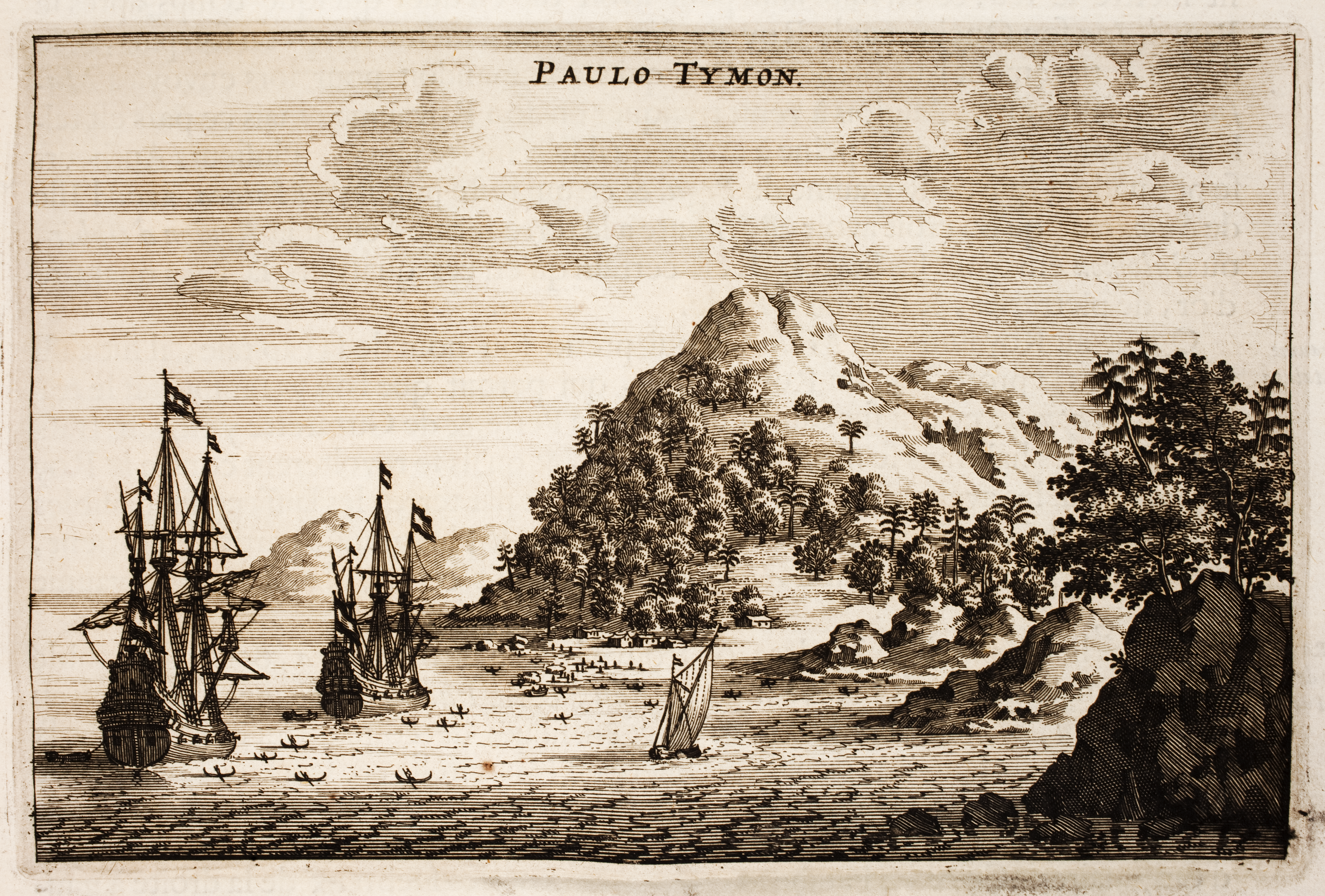
"Paulo Tymon", Nieuhof: Ambassade vers la Chine, 1665.

Tioman has been used for thousands of years by Austronesian fishermen as an essential navigation point and a source of fresh water and wood. During the past thousand years, it has played host to Chinese, Arab, and European trading ships en route to Champa, and often Chinese porcelain shards can be found on beaches around the island.

In more recent history, Tioman played host to both the British and the Japanese navies during the Second World War. As a result, the waters around the island are littered with war remains, including HMS Repulse and HMS Prince of Wales.

Buildings with more than three stories are not allowed on Tioman Island. Tioman Island is to be granted municipality status soon..

== Nature ==
The marine area around Tioman Island and eight other nearby islands have been declared as marine parks and marine reserves.

Apart from its diverse marine life, the inland rainforest area was protected in 1972 as the Pulau Tioman Wildlife Reserve. However, a large part of the original reserve was sacrificed for agricultural and touristic development in 1984; the remaining area is approximately 8,296 ha (20,500 acres). There are several protected species of mammals on the island, including the binturong, long-tailed macaque, slow loris, black giant squirrel, red giant flying squirrel, mouse deer, brush-tailed porcupine, and common palm civet, from a total of 45 species of mammals and 138 species of birds, including the majestic frigatebird. Moreover, Tioman has species that are endemic to its shores. The Tioman walking catfish Clarias batu can be seen on rainforest walks. Kajang slender litter frog is only known from Mount Kajang.

Tioman Island Marine Park hosts three marine ecosystems: coral reef, seagrass bed, and mangrove forest. The coral reefs accommodate 350 species of scleractinian corals from 67 genera including three endangered species (Alveopora minuta, Isopora togianensis and Pectinia maxima), 86 vulnerable species and 85 near threatened species, 326 species of coral reef fish from 55 families including the endangered humphead wrasse, vulnerable blacktip reef shark, slender bambooshark, tawny nurse shark, brown-marbled grouper, squaretail coral grouper, finless sleeper ray, Jenkin's whipray and the near threatened blackspot tuskfish and Bower's parrotfish, and 76 taxa of benthic macroalgae. The seagrass beds support 3 species of seagrass and can be found near Kampung Air Batang, Kampung Genting, Teluk Nipah, Teluk Mukut and between Japamala Resort and Pasir Cina. The mangrove forests, a total of 59.90 hectares, support 23 mangrove species including a new hybrid species, one endangered species (Heritiera globose) which can be found near Kampung Genting and Kampung Juara and two near threatened species (Ceriops decandra and Sonneratia ovata) which can be found near Kampung Juara.

== Impacts ==
Tioman's corals have been affected by a mass bleaching event in 2010 whereby the island lost a significant portion of its live coral cover. That resulted in many corals turning a dull white colour and some even fragmenting into pieces of dead coral skeleton. The 2016 bleaching event only just touched on Tioman's Coral Reefs, and as such, the coral has remained in good and healthy condition.

A proposal to build an international airport on Tioman Island which were rejected by authorities in 2018 due to the scale of the environmental impacts it would cause are still very much in the works as an environmental impact assessment (EIA) for the project has been submitted. The new airport would cover 186.4 hectares (460.6 acres) of the island's west coast between the villages of Kampung Paya and Kampung Genting. 76% of the development area would need to be land reclaimed from the sea (142.70 hectares) within Pulau Tioman Marine Park, according to the EIA report. Impacts on the marine environment cited in the EIA report include direct destruction of coral reefs and coastal habitats, underwater construction noise, pollutant runoff, artificial lighting, and plumes of silt and sediment. The development could displace local businesses, extinguish tourism revenue in two of the island's seven villages, and have cascading effects on the island's already limited natural resource.

The EIA report suggests carrying out a marine conservation and rehabilitation plan, which involves relocating and propagating corals to four designated sites and two coral farms before any construction begins. While the relocation of corals may appear to be a measure to protect these fragile organisms, it is important to examine the drawbacks and limitations of this approach. Relocating corals from their natural habitats to new sites can have an adverse effect on their survival and the ecosystems they support. Transplanted corals often struggle to adapt to new conditions, leading to a high mortality rate. The disturbance caused by relocation can disrupt the balance of the ecosystem and result in long-term ecological consequences.

The EIA report states that 54% of 300 island residents surveyed about the development viewed the development positively. However, the report concedes that many respondents were residents of Kampung Tekek, a village in the northern, most developed part of the island, far from the development footprint and close to a large resort linked to the project developer. In contrast, representatives surveyed from the affected villages of Kampung Genting and Kampung Paya typically held a negative view of the airport proposal.

The EIA report was prepared by Asia Pacific Environmental Consultants Sdn. Bhd. for Tioman Infra Sdn. Bhd., a subsidiary part-owned by the Berjaya Group, a Malaysia-based corporation that also operates a resort on the island. The project developer is Tioman Infra Sdn Bhd, a wholly owned subsidiary of Tioman Hill Resort Sdn Bhd which is 50% owned by Berjaya Group. The rest is owned by the royal family of Pahang through Aimvesco Sdn Bhd and the late Sultan Ahmad Shah.

Ghost nets are becoming increasingly common around the island, harming local wildlife.

== Tourist attractions ==
=== Tioman Island ===
- Tioman Airport
- Panuba Bay
- Salang
- Tekek Village
- Minang Cove - The only cove of Tioman Island
- Asah Waterfall
- Bagus Place Retreat - The most eco-friendly area on Tioman Island
- Juara Turtle Project - volunteer sea turtle and environmental conservation
- Golden City - part of Salang village
- Air Batang - also known as ABC

=== Around Tioman ===
- Pulo Jehat
- Tulai Island (Pulau Tulai) also known as Coral Island, famous for its white sandy beach and amazing snorkeling and dive sites
- Renggis Island - a popular snorkeling and dive site known for sightings of sharks and turtles near Tekek Village
- Soyak Island - a popular snorkeling and dive site close to Salang Village
- Tomok Island - a popular snorkeling and dive site close to Paya Village

Popular Dive and Snorkeling Sites off the coast of Tulai/Coral Island

  - Sepoi Island
  - Labas Island
  - Chebeh Island

== Climate ==
Climate data for Tioman Island
Month	Jan	Feb	Mar	Apr	May	Jun	Jul	Aug	Sep	Oct	Nov	Dec	Year
Record high °C (°F)	32.5 (90.5)	33.5 (92.3)	34.8 (94.6)	35.1 (95.2)	36.4 (97.5)	35.0 (95.0)	34.3 (93.7)	34.8 (94.6)	34.3 (93.7)	36.2 (97.2)	34.3 (93.7)	33.2 (91.8)	36.4 (97.5)
Mean daily maximum °C (°F)	28.4 (83.1)	29.3 (84.7)	30.5 (86.9)	31.7 (89.1)	32.1 (89.8)	31.5 (88.7)	31.1 (88.0)	31.0 (87.8)	31.1 (88.0)	31.2 (88.2)	29.8 (85.6)	28.5 (83.3)	30.5 (86.9)
Daily mean °C (°F)	25.9 (78.6)	26.4 (79.5)	26.8 (80.2)	26.9 (80.4)	26.7 (80.1)	26.4 (79.5)	26.0 (78.8)	25.9 (78.6)	25.8 (78.4)	25.9 (78.6)	25.7 (78.3)	25.6 (78.1)	26.2 (79.1)
Mean daily minimum °C (°F)	23.7 (74.7)	23.8 (74.8)	23.4 (74.1)	23.1 (73.6)	23.2 (73.8)	23.0 (73.4)	22.6 (72.7)	22.6 (72.7)	22.5 (72.5)	22.7 (72.9)	22.9 (73.2)	23.3 (73.9)	23.1 (73.5)
Record low °C (°F)	18.6 (65.5)	18.6 (65.5)	18.9 (66.0)	20.5 (68.9)	20.6 (69.1)	20.5 (68.9)	19.7 (67.5)	19.8 (67.6)	20.0 (68.0)	20.4 (68.7)	20.5 (68.9)	20.4 (68.7)	18.6 (65.5)
Average precipitation mm (inches)	332.1 (13.07)	141.1 (5.56)	140.7 (5.54)	121.5 (4.78)	140.0 (5.51)	144.8 (5.70)	164.5 (6.48)	176.4 (6.94)	169.6 (6.68)	201.4 (7.93)	361.3 (14.22)	625.0 (24.61)	2,718.4 (107.02)
Average precipitation days	16	11	11	12	14	14	15	16	15	17	22	23	186
Average relative humidity (%)	83	82	83	86	87	87	87	88	88	87	88	87	86
Source: Malaysian Meteorological Department

== Politics ==
Tioman Island lends its name to the state constituency of Tioman, comprising the island and part of the Rompin District including the town of Kuala Rompin. Its representative to the State Legislative Assembly is Mohd. Johari Hussain from UMNO-Barisan Nasional. Its representative to the Malaysian Parliament is Abdul Khalib Abdullah from BERSATU-Perikatan Nasional.

== Non-governmental organisations ==
- Juara Turtle Project- volunteer sea turtle and environmental conservation
- Reef Check Malaysia - build ecological and social resilience on Tioman Island through its Cintai Tioman Programme

== Transportation ==
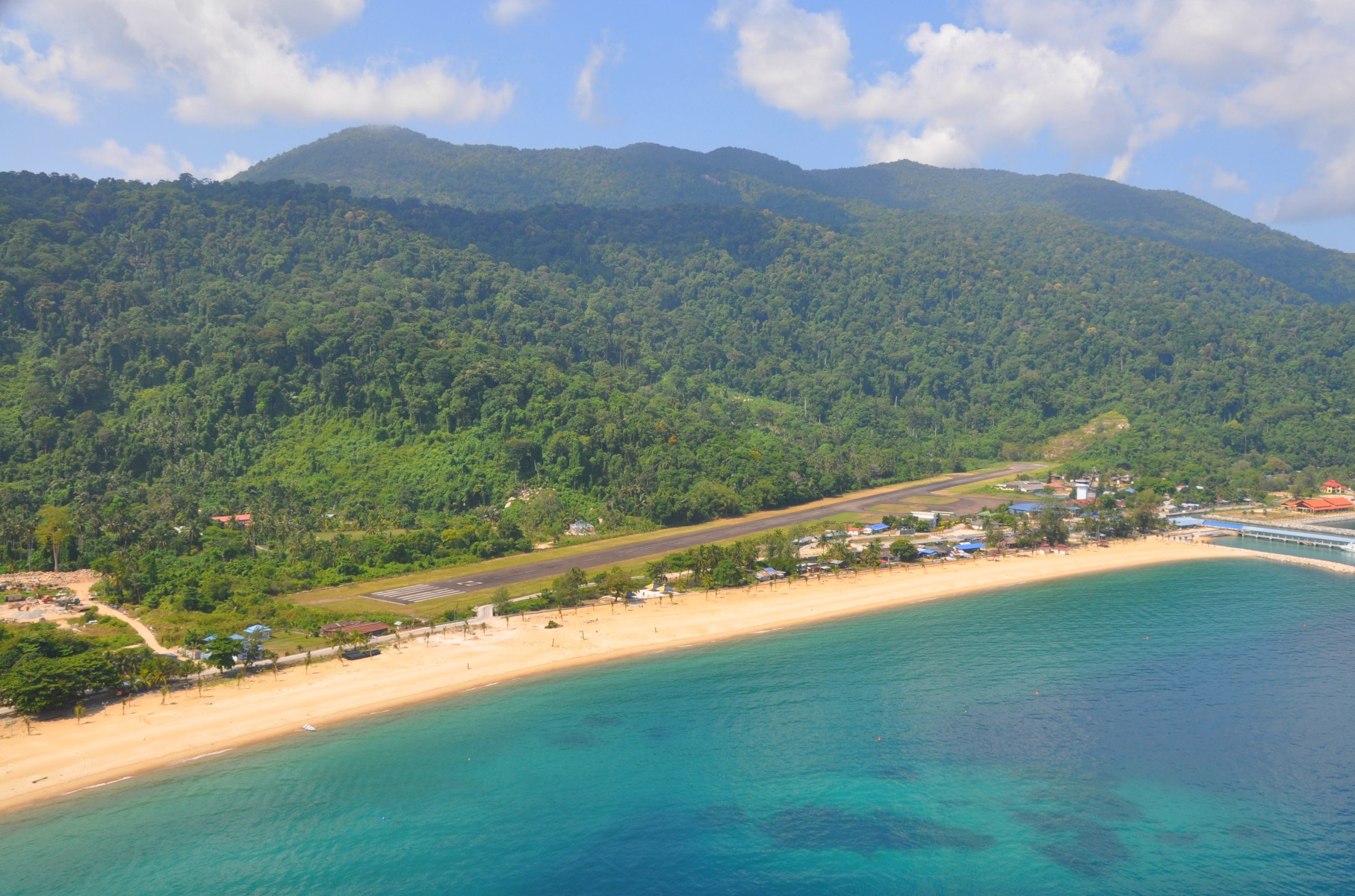
Tioman Airport.

=== Air ===
The island houses the Tioman Airport with flights from Subang.

A proposal to build an international airport through land reclamation was rejected in 2018 on environmental grounds, although the proposal has been raised since.

Currently (May 2024) there are no commercial flights to Pulau Tioman, and discussions of an airport expansion are still on-going.

=== Water ===
The island is served by ferries from Mersing, Johor and Tanjung Gemok, Pahang. Both are located in Malaysia. Currently, two ferry companies are operating in both jetties. You can purchase the ticket at the counter book directly from their respective website to secure your seats in advance.

1. Bluewater Ferry

2. Cata Ferry

3. Jetty Location

== Legend ==
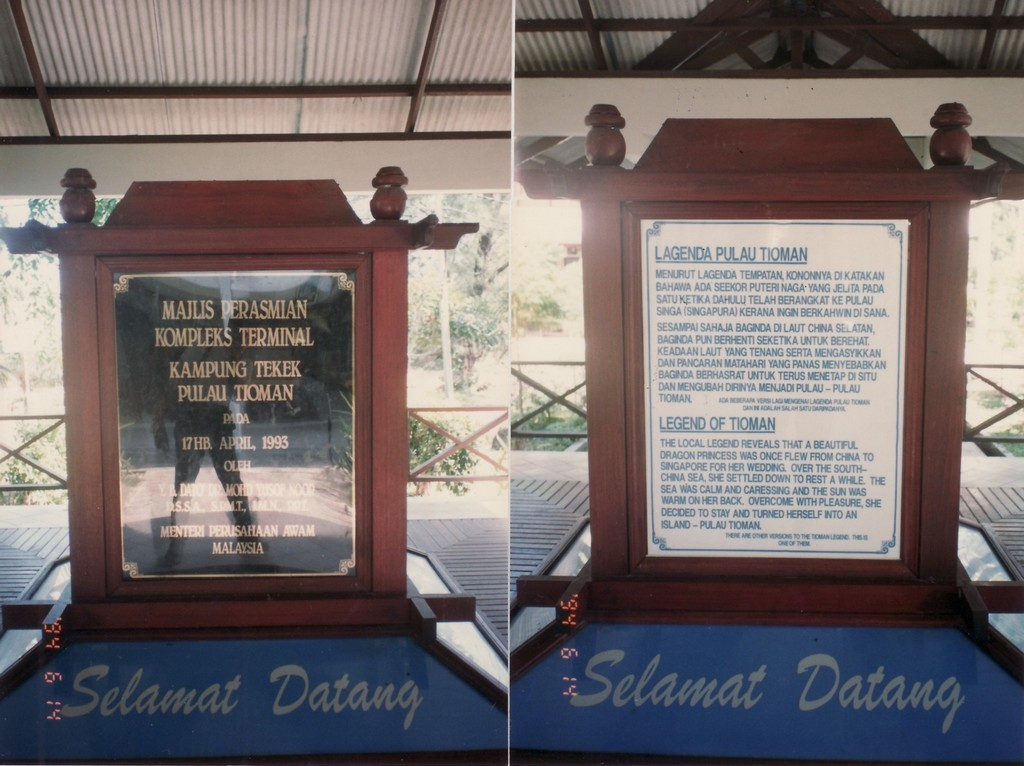
A picture of a wooden tomb with Tioman Island's legend written on it.

According to legend, Tioman Island is the resting place of a beautiful dragon princess. Whilst flying to visit her prince in Singapore, this beautiful maiden stopped to seek solace in the crystal-clear waters of the South China Sea. Enraptured by the charms of the place, she decided to discontinue her journey. By taking the form of an island, she pledged to offer shelter and comfort to passing travellers.

Local mythology claims that the island is the embodiment of the mighty dragon Sri Gumom. The dragon was on his way to visit his sister Gunung Linga (Lingin Peak). Still, the great Sri Rama forbade the meeting, and Sri Gumom was turned into a stone and fell into the deep sea where he now remains, frozen in eternity as this beautiful island with its distinctive topography.

== Radio and television ==
=== Radio ===
Community radio within Tioman:

- FM 90.0
- FM 96.8 (Pahang FM) - owned by Radio Televisyen Malaysia
- FM 100.7 Nasional FM
- FM 103.2 (Airport radio)
- FM 104.0 (Tioman community radio)
- FM 104.1

From Malaysian mainland:

- FM 88.3 Minnal FM - owned by Radio Televisyen Malaysia
- FM 89.1 Ai FM - owned by Radio Televisyen Malaysia
- FM 90.1 Radio Klasik - owned by Radio Televisyen Malaysia
- FM 92.1 Johor FM - owned by Radio Televisyen Malaysia
- FM 92.9 (TraXX FM) - owned by Radio Televisyen Malaysia
- FM 102.5 Best FM

=== Television ===
- TV1 - Channel 50 (Temporarily unavailable)
- TV2 - Channel 53 (Temporarily unavailable) - Currently broadcasting on Channel 11
- TV3 - Channel 32
- NTV7 -
- 8TV - Channel 7
- TV9 - Channel 9
- TV Alhijrah - Channel 40

Local:

- TV5 - Channel 5

== See also ==
- Tioman Airport
- List of islands of Malaysia
- List of islands in the South China Sea
