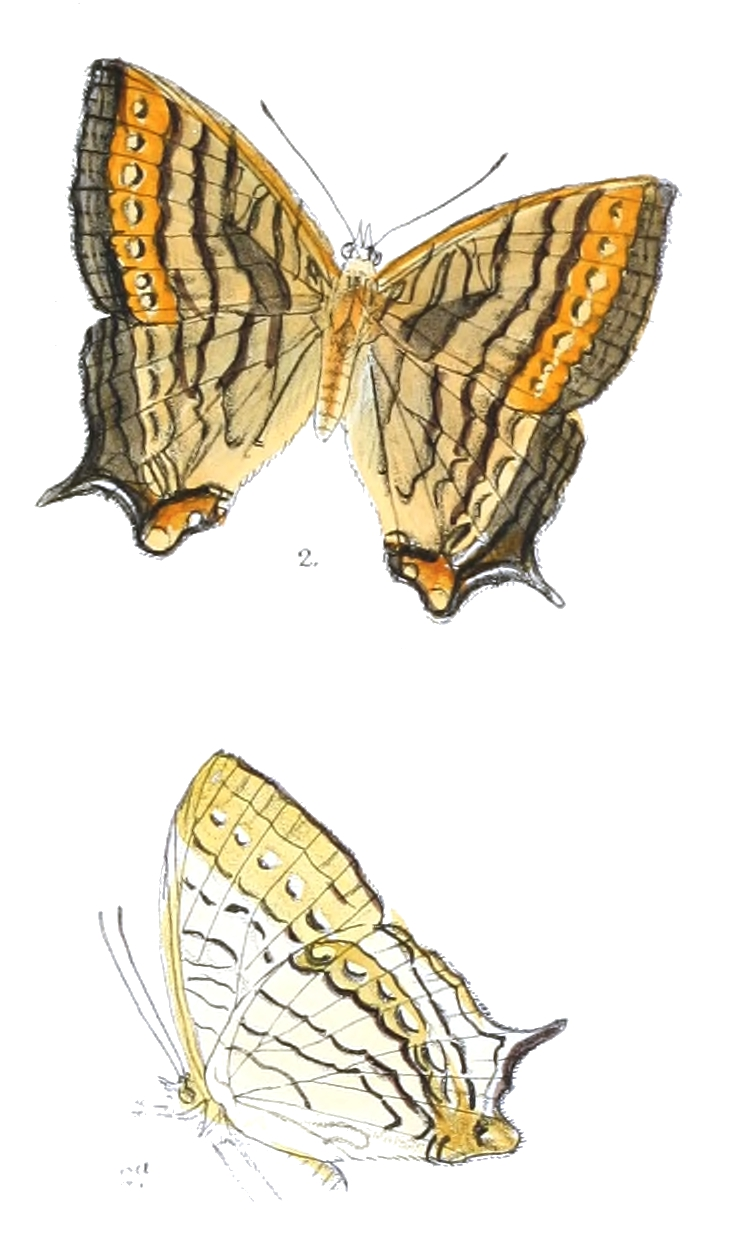

Scientific classification
- Kingdom: Animalia
- Phylum: Arthropoda
- Class: Insecta
- Order: Lepidoptera
- Family: Nymphalidae
- Genus: Cyrestis
- Species: C. tabula

Binomial name
- Cyrestis tabula de Nicéville, 1883

= Cyrestis tabula =

Species of butterfly

Cyrestis tabula, the Nicobar map, is a butterfly in the family Nymphalidae. It is found in the Nicobar Islands. It was described by Lionel de Nicéville in 1883. This species is monotypic.

== Description ==
The upperside is deep ochreous in color with black markings. Both of the wings have a broad black border. The underside is like the upperside in color, but the markings are narrower. The antennae are black.
