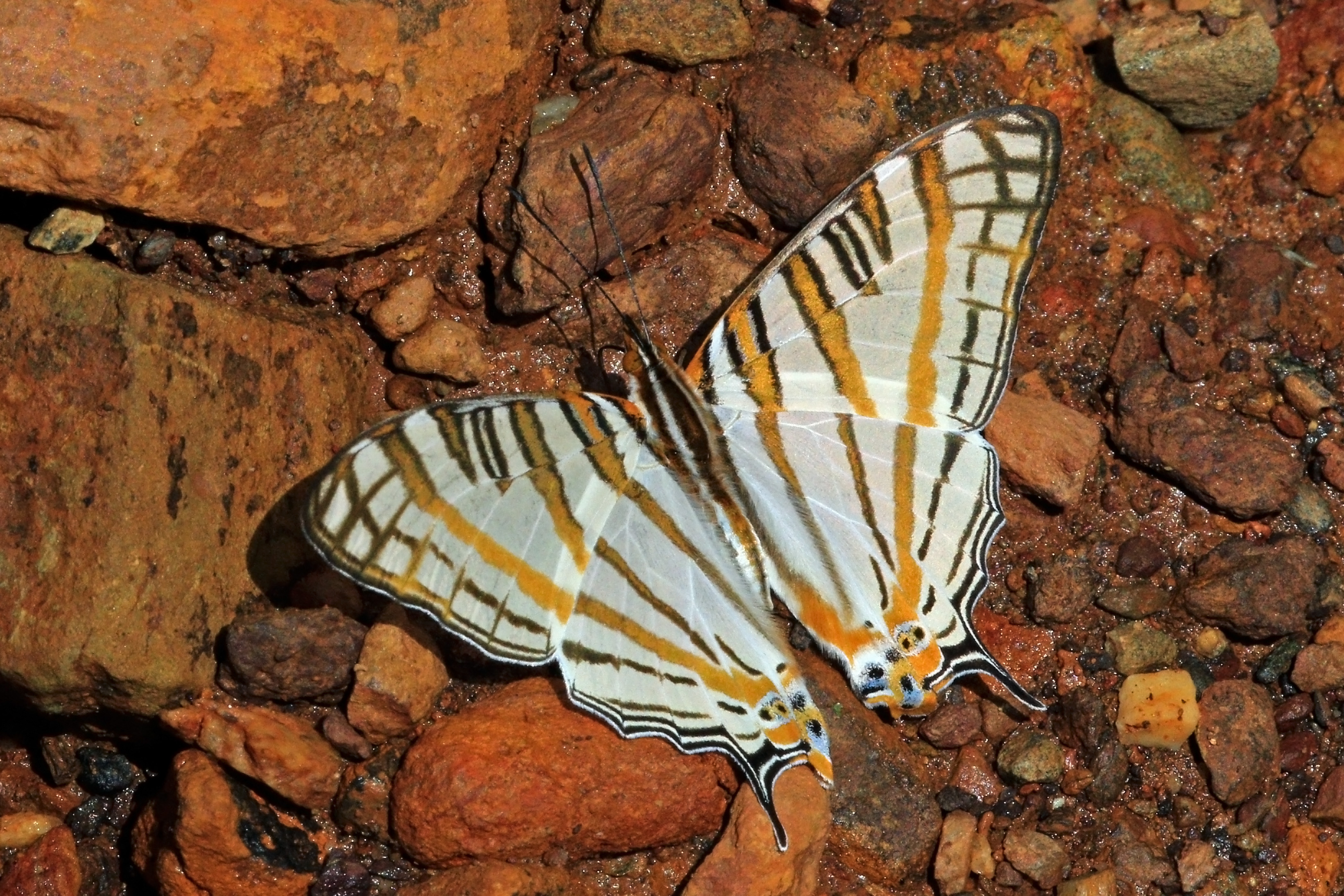
- C. c. camillus in the Kakamega Forest, Kenya

Scientific classification
- Kingdom: Animalia
- Phylum: Arthropoda
- Clade: Pancrustacea
- Class: Insecta
- Order: Lepidoptera
- Family: Nymphalidae
- Genus: Cyrestis
- Species: C. camillus

Binomial name
- Cyrestis camillus (Fabricius, 1781)

Synonyms
- Papilio camillus Fabricius, 1781; Cyrestis (Azania) camillus; Papilio pantheus Drury, 1782; Cyrestis camillus f. donckieri Le Cerf, 1927; Cyrestis sublineata Lathy, 1901

= Cyrestis camillus =

African map butterfly

Species of butterfly

Cyrestis camillus, the African map butterfly, is a butterfly of the family Nymphalidae. It is found in Africa, from Sierra Leone to Ethiopia and Tanzania and from Kenya to Natal.

== Description ==
The wingspan is 42–55 mm.The transverse bands, especially the second, third and sixth, are broad, edged with blackish and filled in with bronzy brown; the anal lobe and anal angle of the hindwing beneath continuously filled in with black. —- ab. nigrescens Martin only differs in having the bands filled in with smoke-black and the yellow colour at the anal angle of the hindwing replaced by blue-grey. Central Africa.

== Biology ==
The larvae feed on Morus, Ficus and Zizyphus species.

== Subspecies ==
- Cyrestis camillus camillus (Sierra Leone to Cameroon, Zaire, Angola, western Kenya, Ethiopia)
- Cyrestis camillus elegans Boisduval, 1833 (Madagascar)
- Cyrestis camillus sublineata Lathy, 1901 (Zimbabwe, Mozambique to Malawi, Zambia, Tanzania, eastern Kenya, South Africa)

Torben Larsen developed a species numbering system for his 2005 publication Butterflies of West Africa. The nominate subspecies is #825. The 'Larsen' numbers have since been used with permission in A Sharp Eye on Butterflies of Ghana.
