= Salang, Malaysia =

Village in Malaysia

Coordinates: 5°54′N 116°42′E

Salang is the northernmost village on the island of Tioman in Pahang, Malaysia, popular with backpackers. It has a few bars, some dive shops and two main chalet complexes. Although the village itself is polluted, it is close to some popular reef sites.
