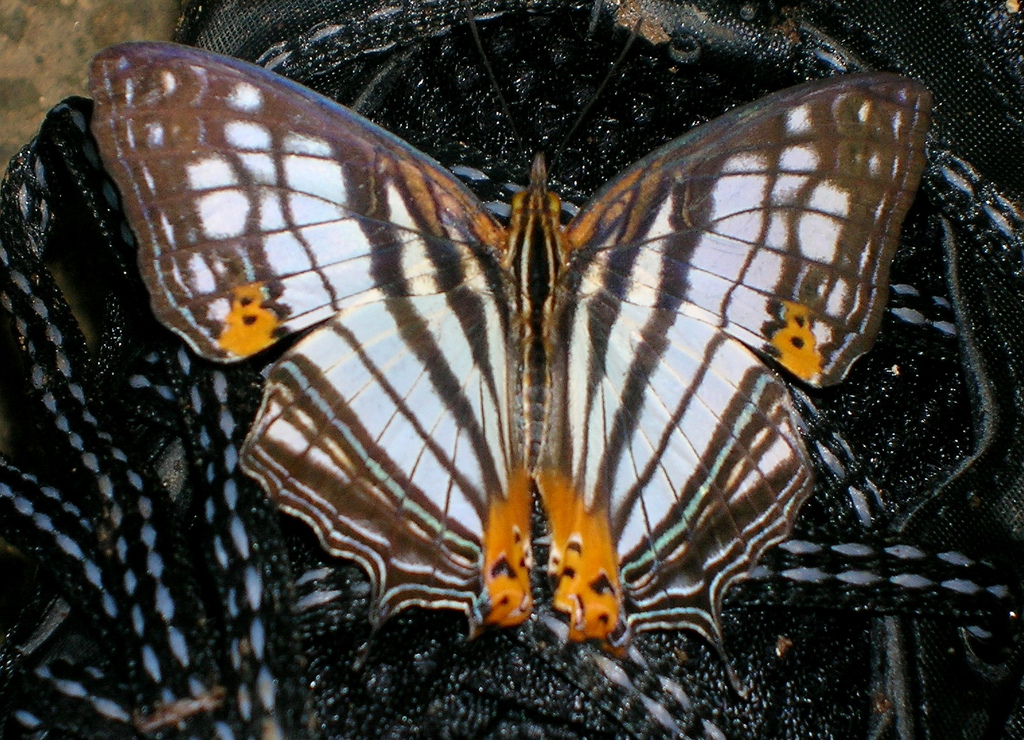

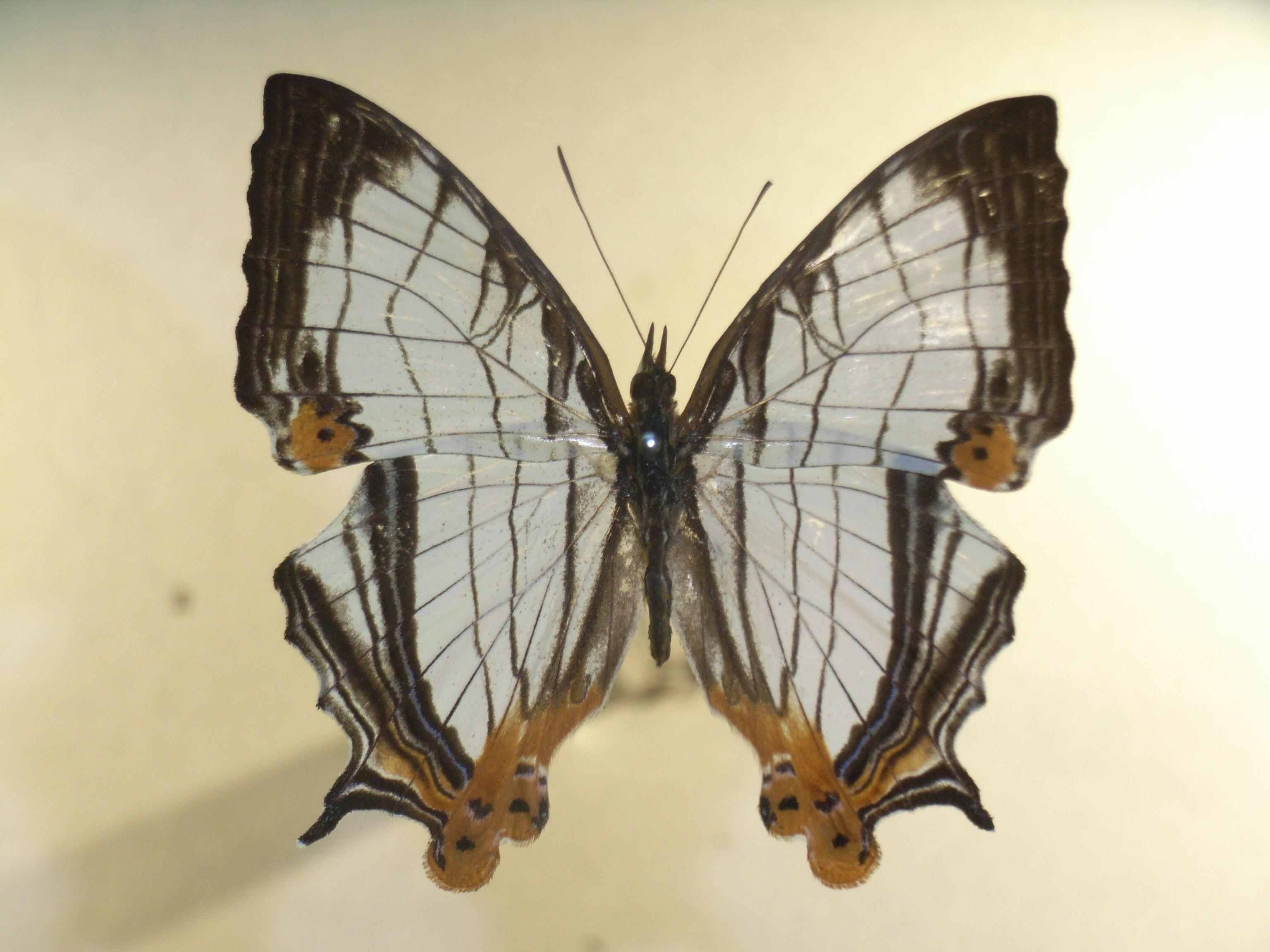

Scientific classification
- Domain: Eukaryota
- Kingdom: Animalia
- Phylum: Arthropoda
- Class: Insecta
- Order: Lepidoptera
- Family: Nymphalidae
- Genus: Cyrestis
- Species: C. maenalis

Binomial name
- Cyrestis maenalis Erichson, 1834

= Cyrestis maenalis =

Species of butterfly

Cyrestis maenalis, the common mapwing, is a species of butterfly of the family Nymphalidae. It is found in South-East Asia.

== Subspecies ==
- Cyrestis maenalis martini Hartert, 1902 (Peninsular Malaya)
- Cyrestis maenalis maenalis (northern Philippines)
- Cyrestis maenalis negros Martin, 1903 (Philippines: Negros)
- Cyrestis maenalis nigrolineata van Eecke, 1914 (Simalue)
- Cyrestis maenalis obscurior Staudinger, 1889 (Philippines: Palawan, Balabac)
- Cyrestis maenalis oebasius Fruhstorfer, 1913 (Philippines: Mindanao)
- Cyrestis maenalis peropaca Hanafusa, 1993 (Indonesia: Mentawai Islands)
- Cyrestis maenalis rothschildi Martin, 1903 (Philippines: Mindoro)
- Cyrestis maenalis seminigra Grose-Smith, 1889 (northern Borneo
- Cyrestis maenalis subobscurus Swinhoe, 1908 (Nias)
- Cyrestis maenalis zamboangensis Jumalon, 1975 (Philippines: western Mindanao)

== Gallery ==
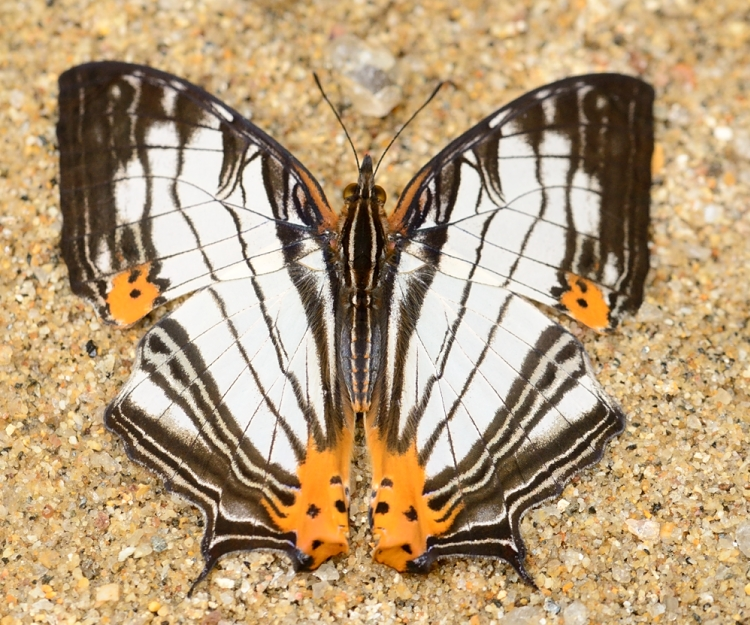
Dark Map-wing (Cyrestis maenalis martini)

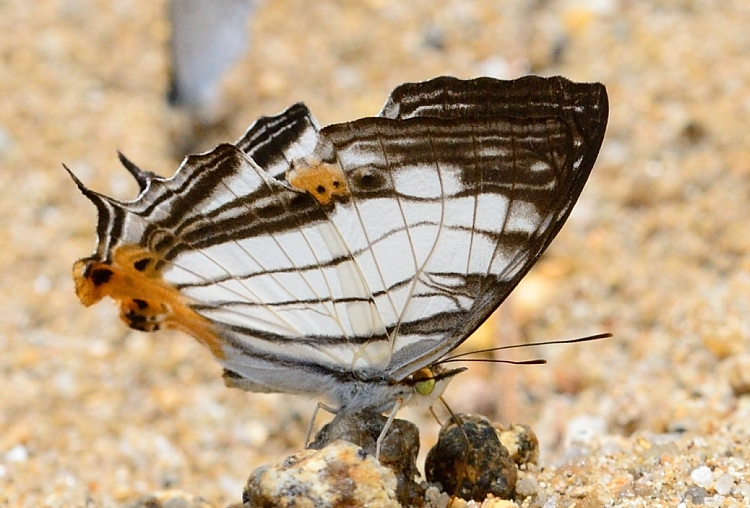
Dark Map-wing (Cyrestis maenalis martini)

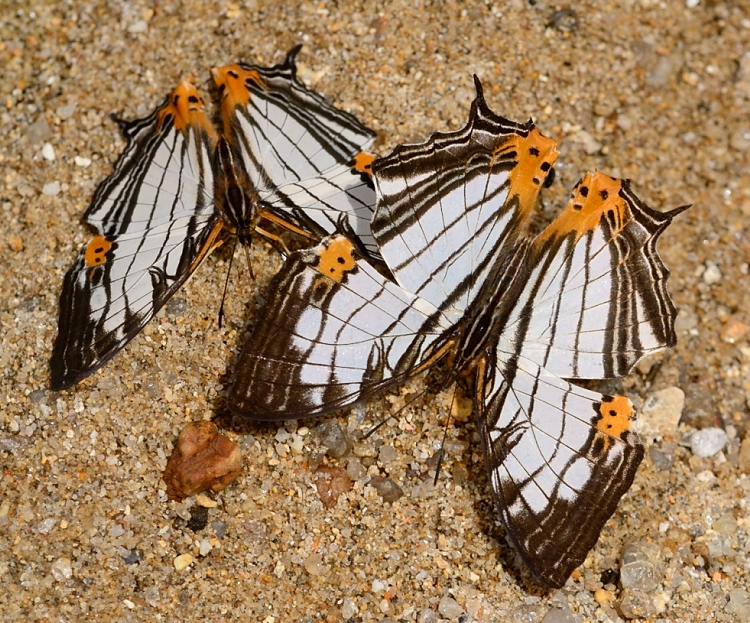
Dark Map-wing (Cyrestis maenalis martini)

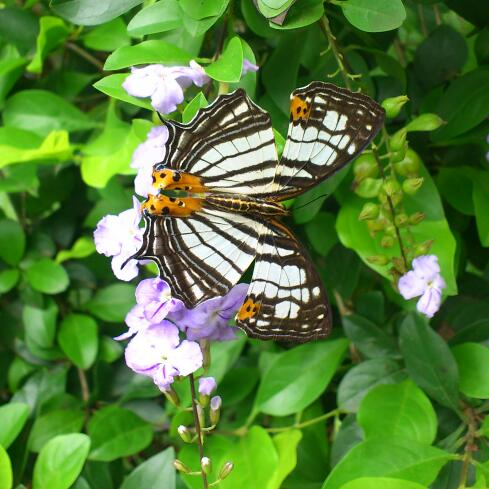
The common mapwing (Cyrestis maenalis maenalis)
