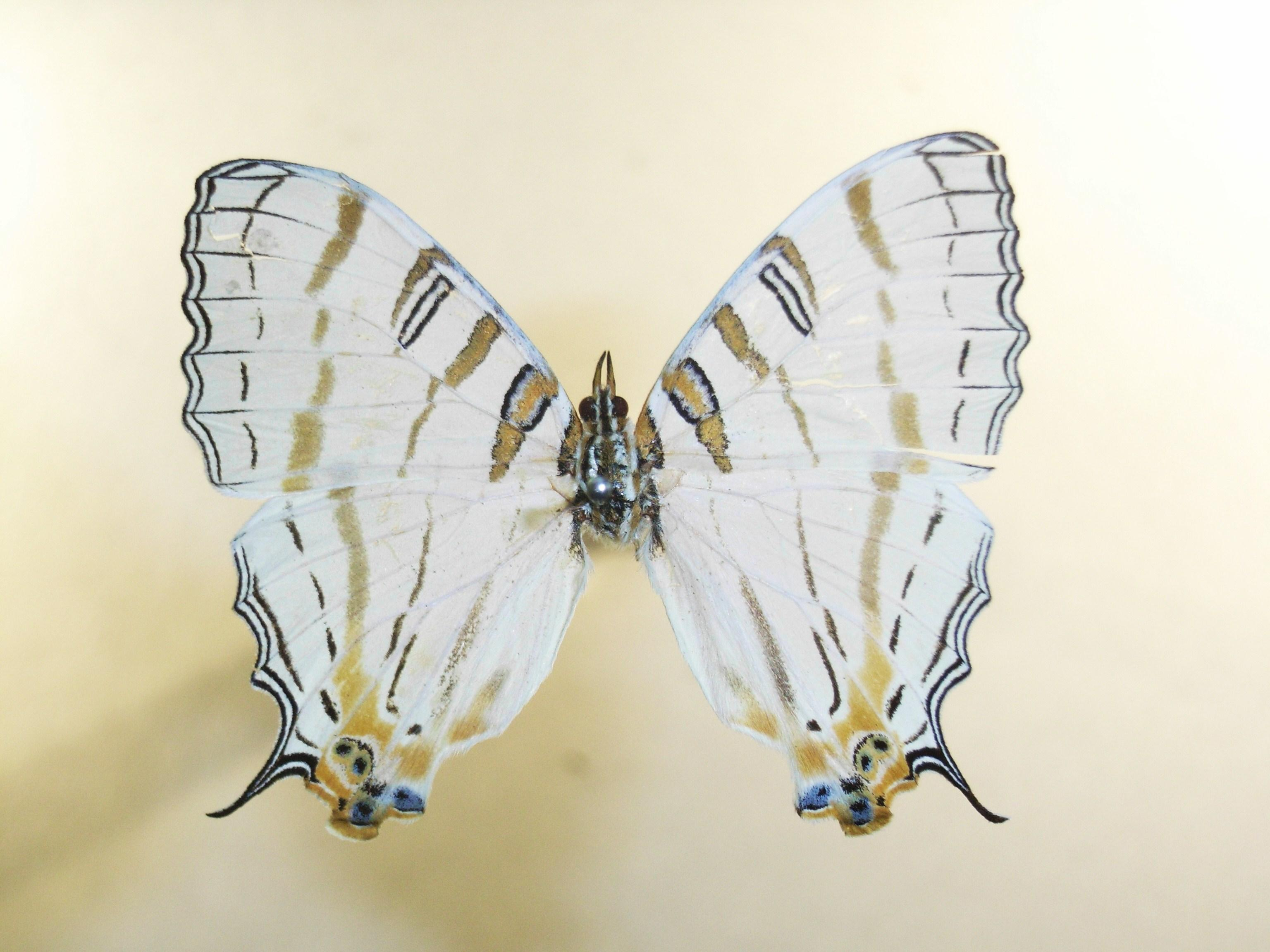

Scientific classification
- Domain: Eukaryota
- Kingdom: Animalia
- Phylum: Arthropoda
- Class: Insecta
- Order: Lepidoptera
- Family: Nymphalidae
- Genus: Cyrestis
- Species: C. camillus
- Subspecies: C. c. elegans

Trinomial name
- Cyrestis camillus elegans Boisduval, 1832

Synonyms
- Cyrestis elegans Boisduval, 1833

= Cyrestis camillus elegans =

Subspecies of butterfly

Cyrestis camillus elegans is a butterfly subspecies in the genus Cyrestis and the family Nymphalidae. It is known from Madagascar.
