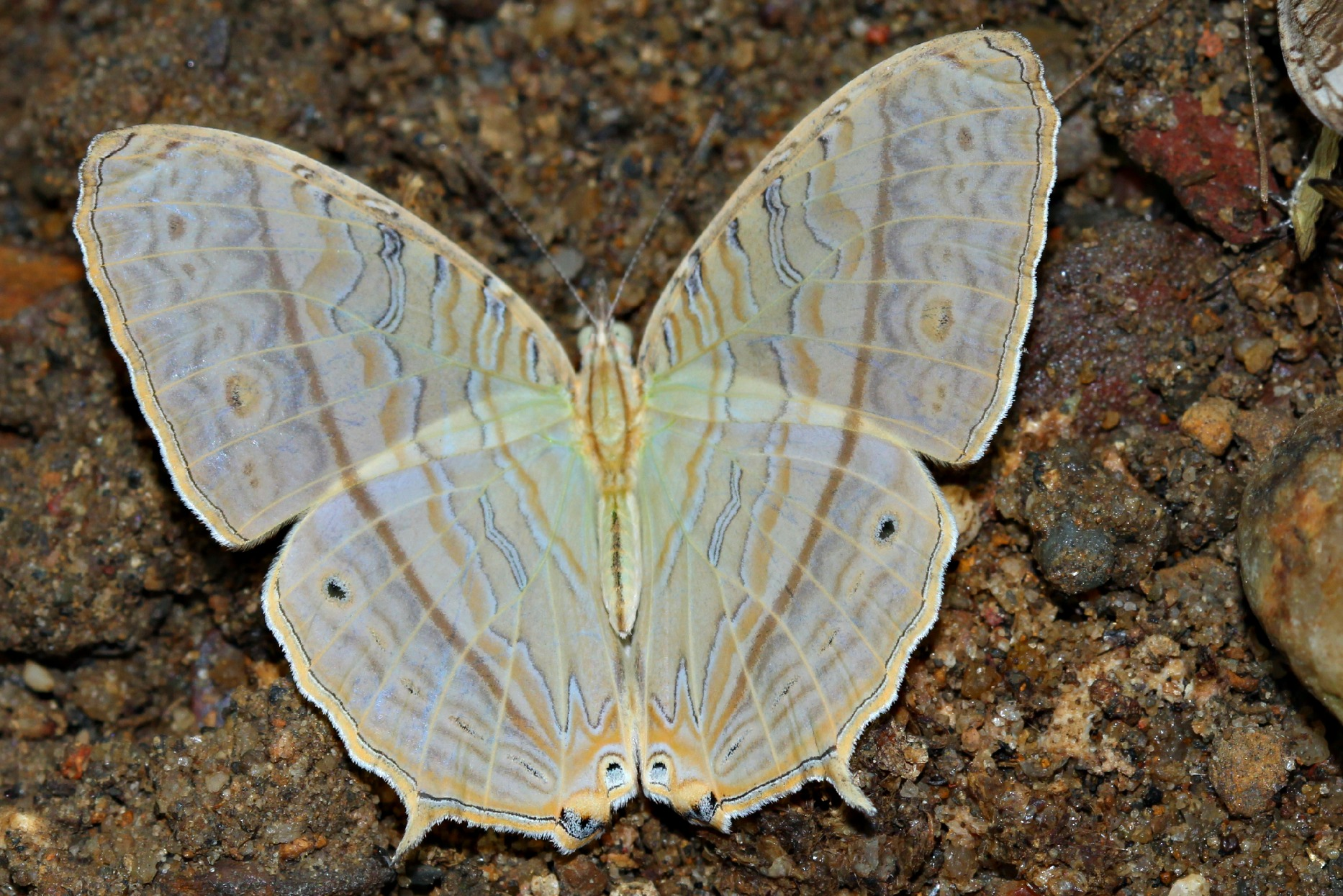

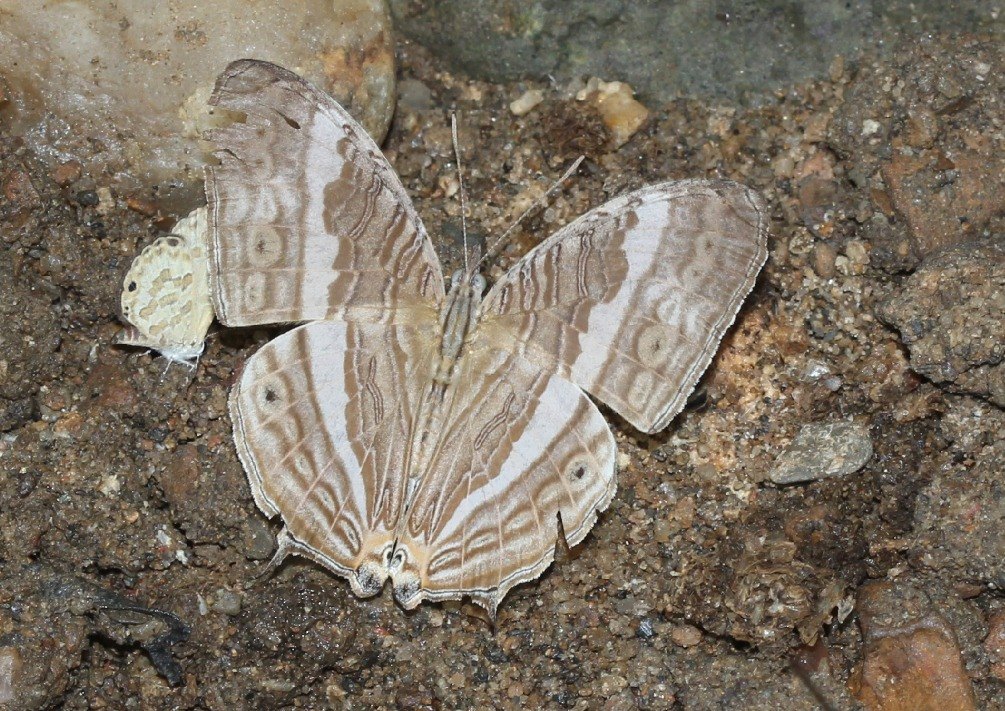
- forms natta (above) and earli (below)

Scientific classification
- Domain: Eukaryota
- Kingdom: Animalia
- Phylum: Arthropoda
- Class: Insecta
- Order: Lepidoptera
- Family: Nymphalidae
- Genus: Cyrestis
- Species: C. cocles

Binomial name
- Cyrestis cocles (Fabricius, 1787)

= Cyrestis cocles =

Marbled map

Species of butterfly

Cyrestis cocles, the marbled map, is a species of nymphalid butterfly found in parts of Asia.

== Description ==
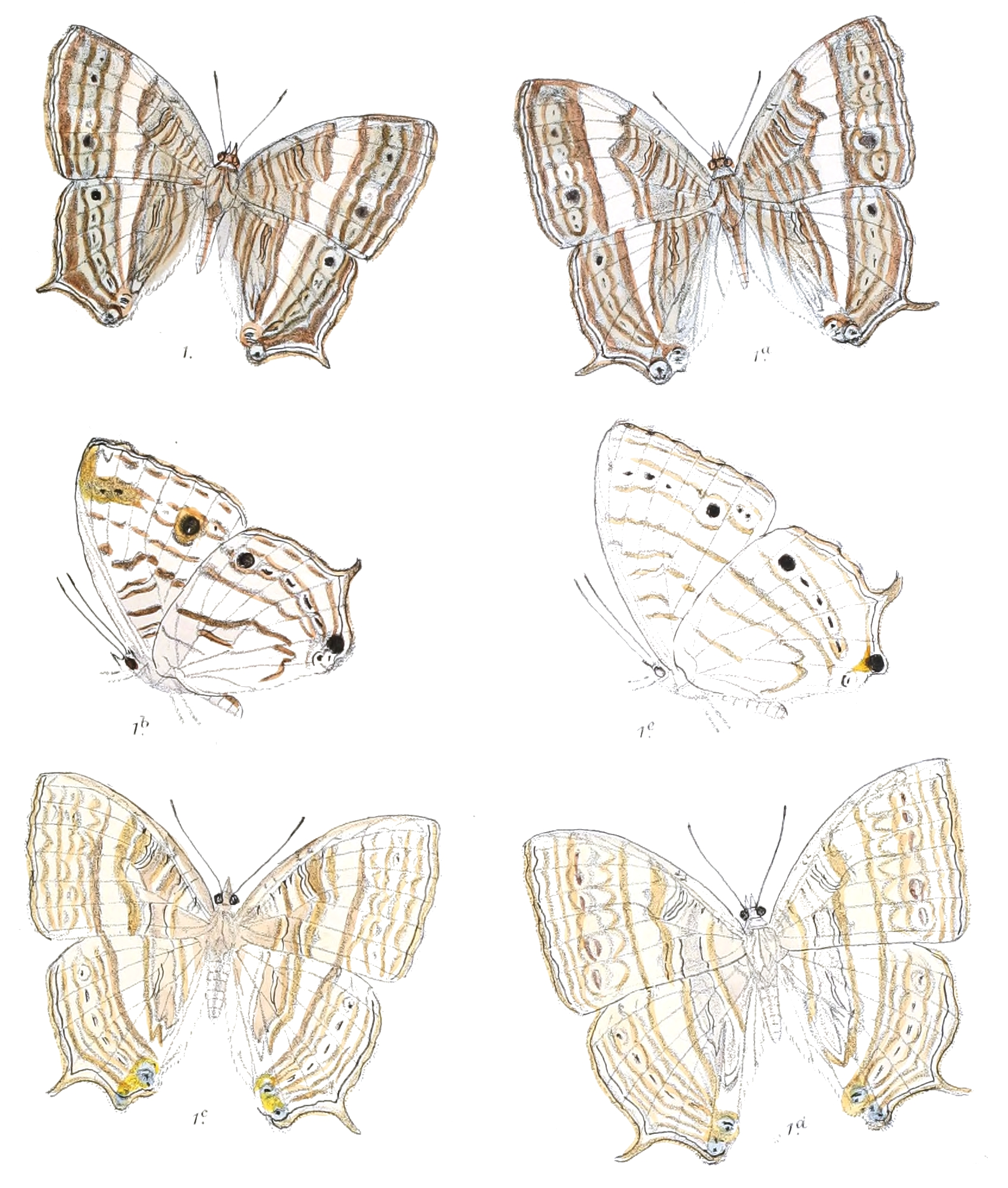

In the wet-season form both the males and females have a broad transverse median white band on the forewings and hindwings. The outer margin of the band is straight while the inner is highly sinuous. The basal and terminal portions of the wings on the inner side of the white band up to the base and on the outer side to the termen more or less greyish brown, traversed by slender sinuous black lines and broader ochraceous-brown lines, the black lines outwardly very narrowly margined with white; the sub-terminal slender black line on both fore and hindwing very conspicuous, and within it a transverse postdiscal series of obscure dusky-centred greyish irregular ocelli; the termen narrowly greyish; cilia white. Underside pearly white with a faint pinkish or pale lilac tinge, the markings of the upperside more or less faintly seen through by transparency; the transverse postdiscal line of greyish ocelli the most prominent, often centred with black. Antenna: dull brown, head, thorax and abdomen pale greyish brown, the latter two with white lateral longitudinal bands; beneath white.

In the dry-season form the upperside is much paler; sometimes fading entirely to creamy white without any wavy markings, except the slender transverse black lines and the line of postdiscal ocelli, which are always more or less present. Underside white, without any pink or pale lilac tint; the markings more faint, but as on the upperside.

== Distribution ==
In India in Sikkim, Bengal, Eastern Ghats (Andhra Pradesh) and Orissa. Extends into Burma, the Andamans, the Malay Peninsula and Indochina.
