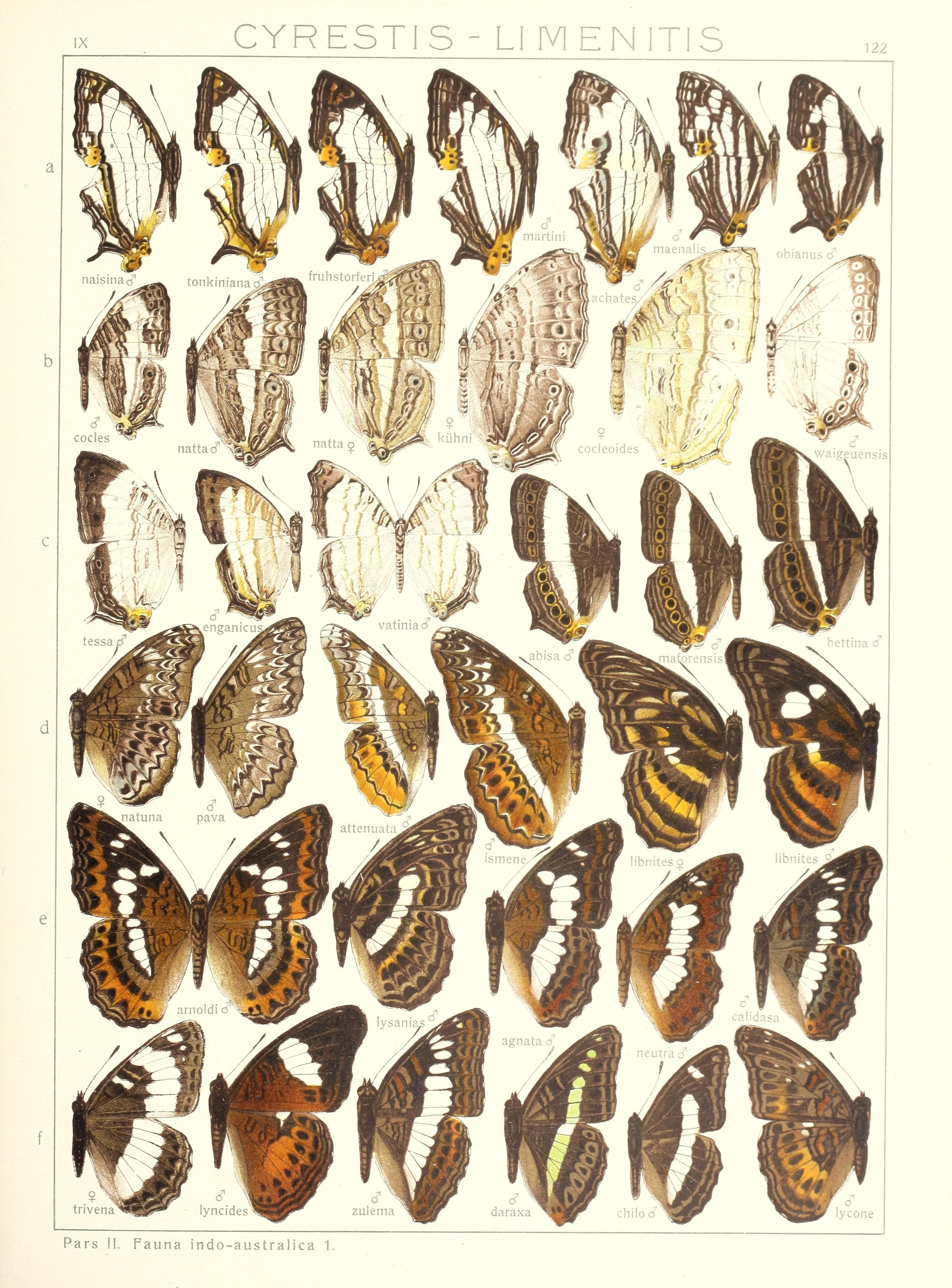
- C. n. naisina in Seitz Die Großschmetterlinge der Erde 9 Die indo-australischen Tagfalter 122a

Scientific classification
- Kingdom: Animalia
- Phylum: Arthropoda
- Clade: Pancrustacea
- Class: Insecta
- Order: Lepidoptera
- Family: Nymphalidae
- Genus: Cyrestis
- Species: C. nais

Binomial name
- Cyrestis nais (Wallace, 1869)

= Cyrestis nais =

Species of butterfly

Cyrestis nais is a butterfly of the family Nymphalidae. It is found in Indonesia.

== Subspecies ==
- C. n. nais Timor
- C. n. naisina Fruhstorfer, 1898 Lombok
- C. n. pallida Martin, 1903 Sumba
