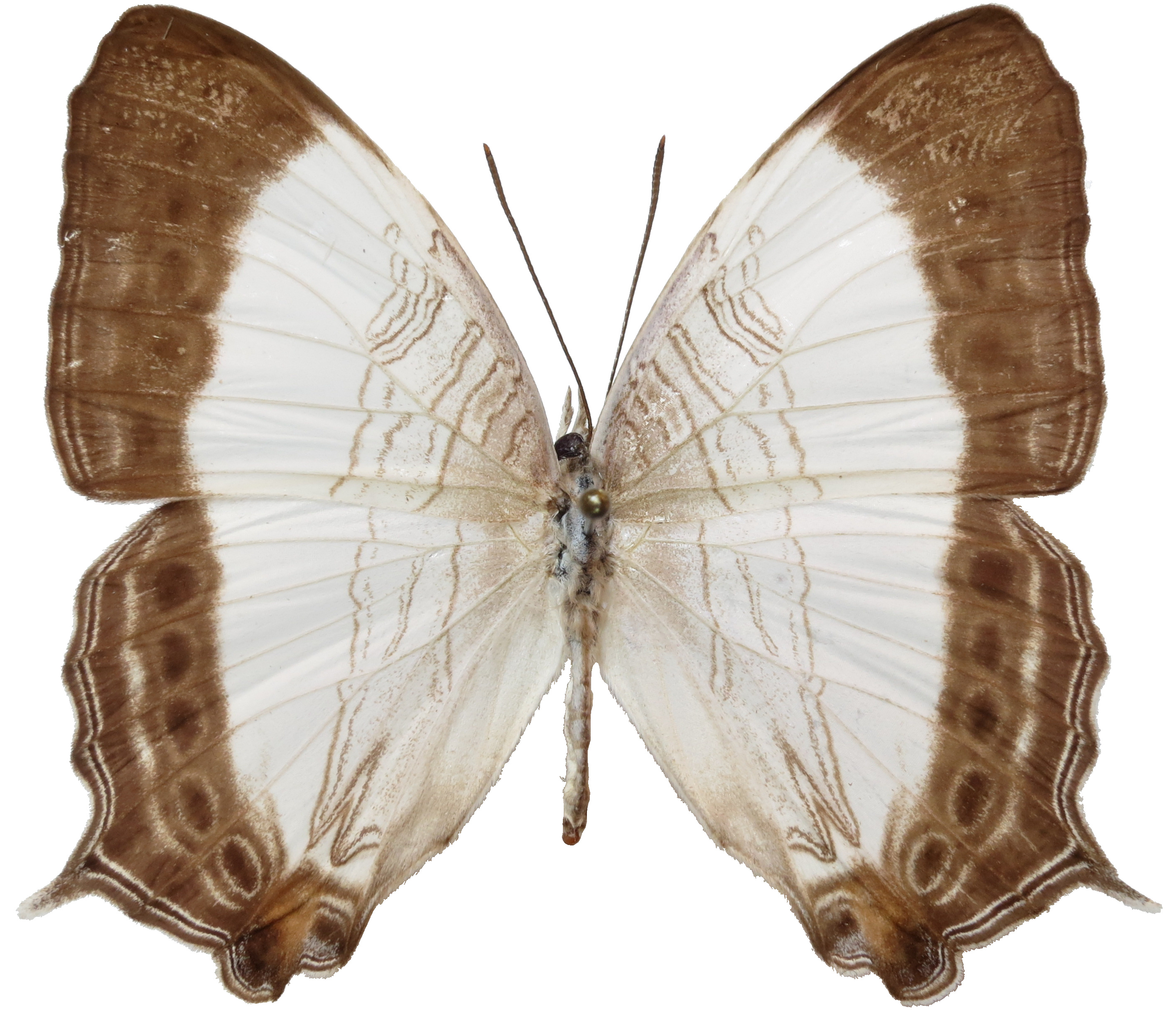
- C. paulinus - Seram Island, Indonesia

Scientific classification
- Kingdom: Animalia
- Phylum: Arthropoda
- Class: Insecta
- Order: Lepidoptera
- Family: Nymphalidae
- Genus: Cyrestis
- Species: C. paulinus

Binomial name
- Cyrestis paulinus (C. & R. Felder, 1860

= Cyrestis paulinus =

Species of butterfly

Cyrestis paulinus is a butterfly of the family Nymphalidae. It is found in the Malay Archipelago. The larva feeds on Streblus ilicifolius.

== Subspecies ==
- C. p. paulinus Moluccas
- C. p. waigeuensis Fruhstorfer, 1900 Waigeu
- C. p. seneca Wallace, 1869 Sula Islands
- C. p. mantilis Staudinger, 1886 Sulawesi, Togian
- C. p. kuehni Röber, 1886 Banggai
- C. p. kransi Jurriaanse & Lindemans, 1920 Butung, Wowoni
- C. p. cassander C. & R. Felder, 1863 Philippines (Luzon)
- C. p. dacebalus Fruhstorfer, 1913 Philippines (Leyte)
- C. p. orchomenus Fruhstorfer, 1913 Philippines (Basilan, Mindanao)
- C. p. thessa Fruhstorfer, 1900 Palawan
