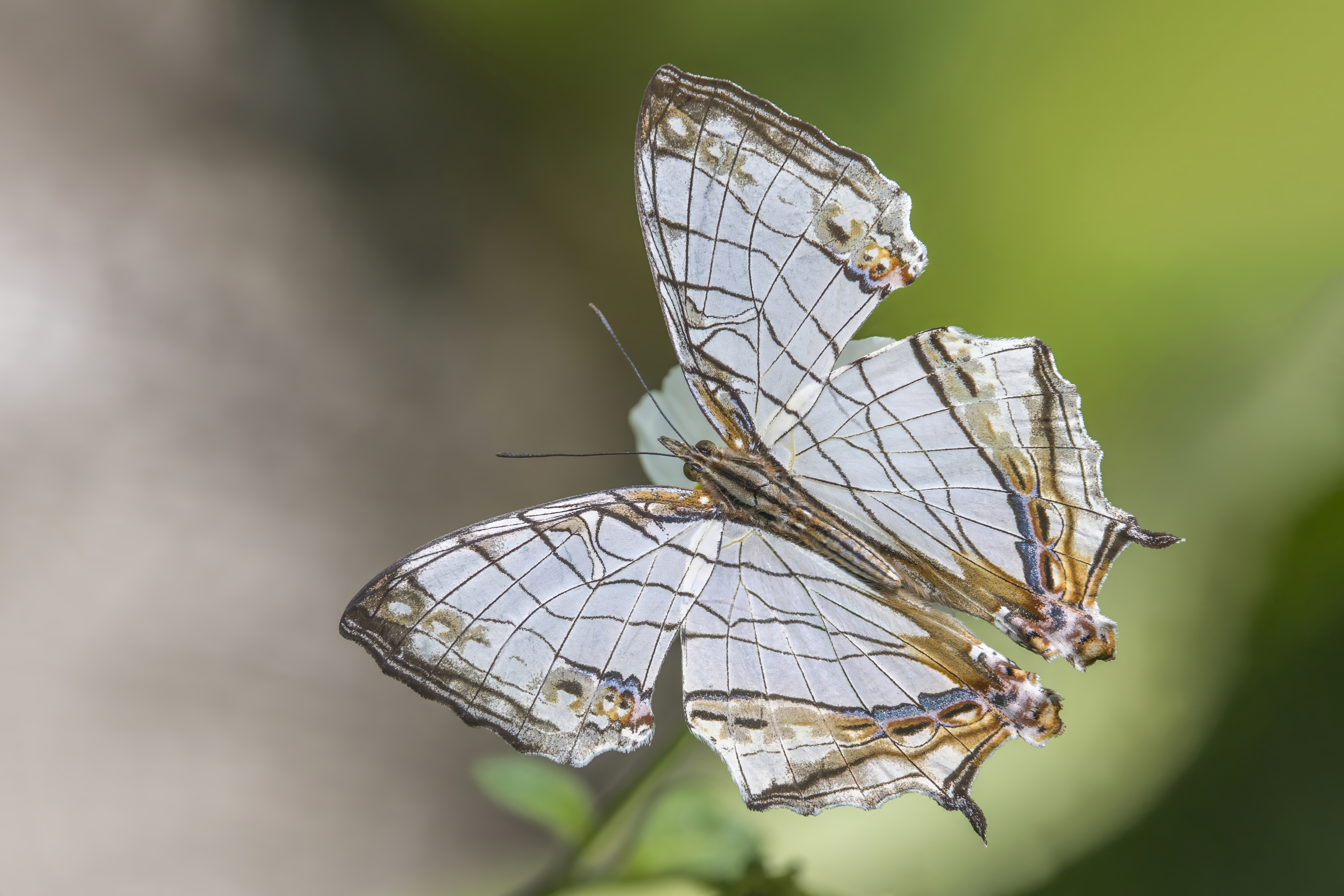
- Male
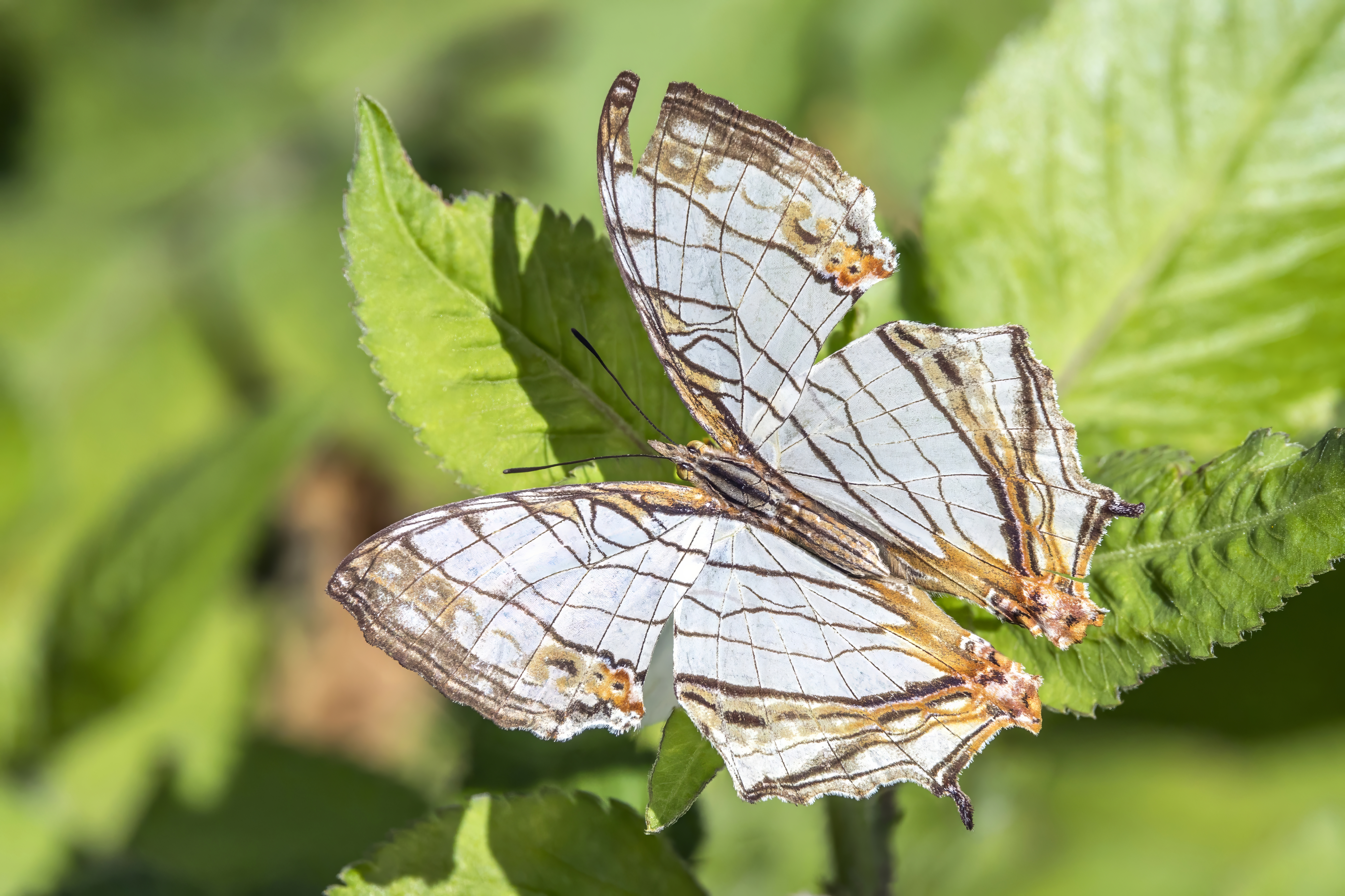
- Female; Both C. t. formosana

Scientific classification
- Kingdom: Animalia
- Phylum: Arthropoda
- Class: Insecta
- Order: Lepidoptera
- Family: Nymphalidae
- Genus: Cyrestis
- Species: C. thyodamas

Binomial name
- Cyrestis thyodamas Boisduval, 1836

= Cyrestis thyodamas =

Species of butterfly

Cyrestis thyodamas, the common map, is a species of butterfly in the family Nymphalidae. It was first described by Jean Baptiste Boisduval in 1836. It is found in the Indian subcontinent and Southeast Asia.

== Description ==
Males and females upperside white, in many specimens pale ochraceous yellow, veins black. Forewing with four very slender irregularly sinuous transverse black lines, the costal margin shaded with ochraceous at base and fuscous beyond; cell crossed by three or four additional short lines; a postdiscal very incomplete series of white-centred broad fuscous rings in the interspaces, tinged with ochraceous near the tornus and broadly interrupted in interspaces 3 and 4; beyond this two transverse black lines not reaching the dorsal margin, shaded with fuscous between; the apex broadly and the termen also shaded with fuscous. Hindwing with three transverse fine lines; a pair of postdiscal broad black lines shaded with light sepia brown between, forming a conspicuous band, the outer line broken and incomplete, followed by two irregular black lines, a subterminal more pronounced black line, and posteriorly a narrow black terminal margin; dorsal margin broadly fuscous at base; apical half and the tornal area and lobe rich ochraceous, with some sepia-brown and black markings. Underside similar, the markings of the upperside showing through by transparency; the ochraceous shading on dorsum and tornal area on hindwing of less extent, but the tornal lobe darker ochraceous with a central large round black spot. The markings both on upper and undersides vary a little in depth of colour and breadth. In many specimens there is a diffuse fuscous spot between the discal pair of transverse fine lines on forewing. Antennae, head, thorax and abdomen above black, thorax and abdomen with lateral greyish longitudinal stripes: beneath white. Body of the female paler than that of the male.

Race andamanica, very closely resembles the typical form; the dark markings, however, are as a rule heavier and more pronounced, but in this some specimens from the Anaimalai Hills approximate very closely to the lighter coloured Andaman individuals. One constant point of difference, however, seems to be the large amount of rich ochraceous colour on the upperside of the hindwing posteriorly. The costal margin and the postdiscal series of rings on the forewing are also strongly tinged with ochraceous. Apparently common at Port Blair.

Expanse 58–70 mm.

=== Larva ===
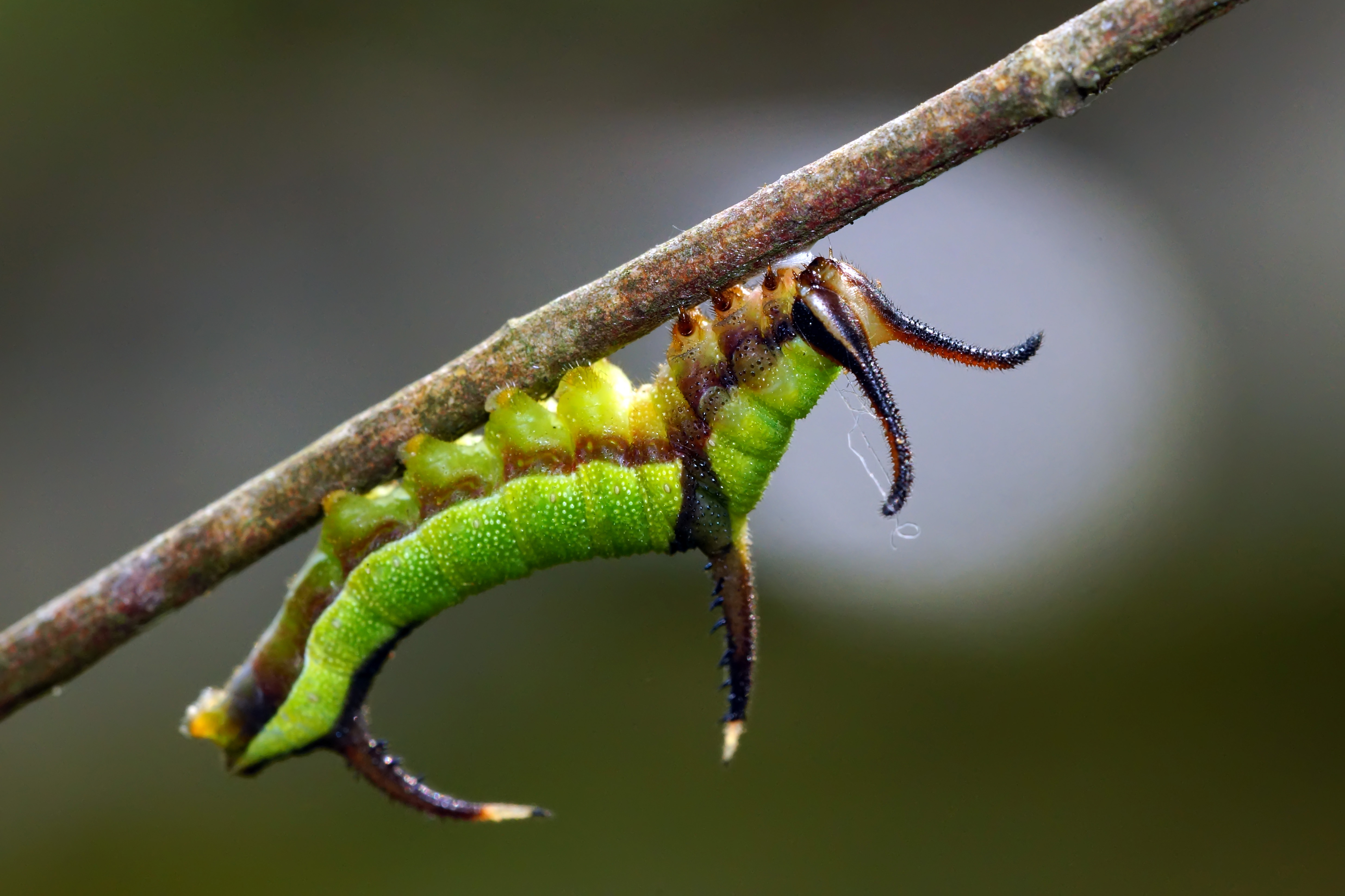
Larva

"Mr. Bell noticed a female on the 10th October depositing its eggs on the tenderest leaves and buds of a banian tree and secured six, of which two were reared. The eggs were curious and beautiful, high domed-shaped or almost conical, with an aperture at the top fitted with a deeply dentate flat cap like a cogged wheel. The larva escaped by raising this and did not eat the shell. The larva was unlike any other that, we have ever seen, slender, cylindrical and smooth; with two long curved divergent filaments or soft horns on the head, a single at outer sword-shaped one on the back at the 5th or 6th segment curved backwards and serrated on its inner edge, and another on the last segment curved forwards and serrated on its outer edge. The colour was a fine reddish brown with a broad green band on the side from the 5th to the last segment."

=== Pupa ===
"Suspended by the tail, very much compressed, with a dorsal ridge from head to tail, high and obtusely pointed in the middle, the palpi-cases united and produced into a long somewhat recurved snout; colour brown with fine dark striae." (Davidson & Aitken)

== Habits ==
It has been recorded as a migrant in southern India and is known to mud-puddle.

== Distribution ==
Continental India generally, from the Himalayas to Travancore, in the hills, avoiding the hot dry plains of northern and central India; Assam; Manipur; Burma; Tenasserim; Kumaun Himalaya extending to China and Japan. A subspecies is present on Taiwan.

== Gallery ==
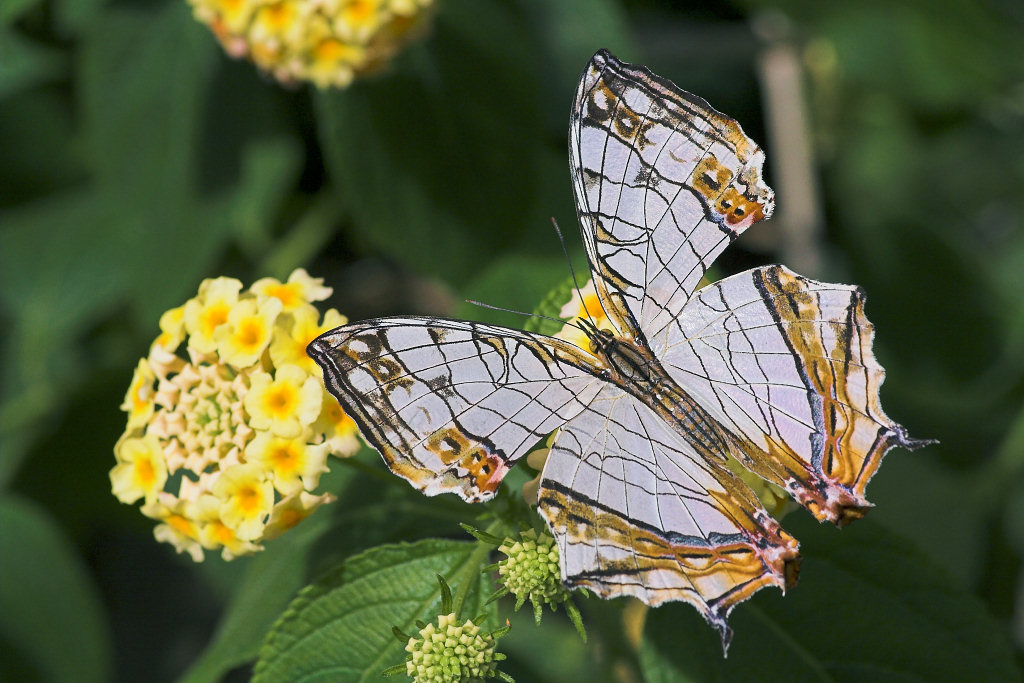

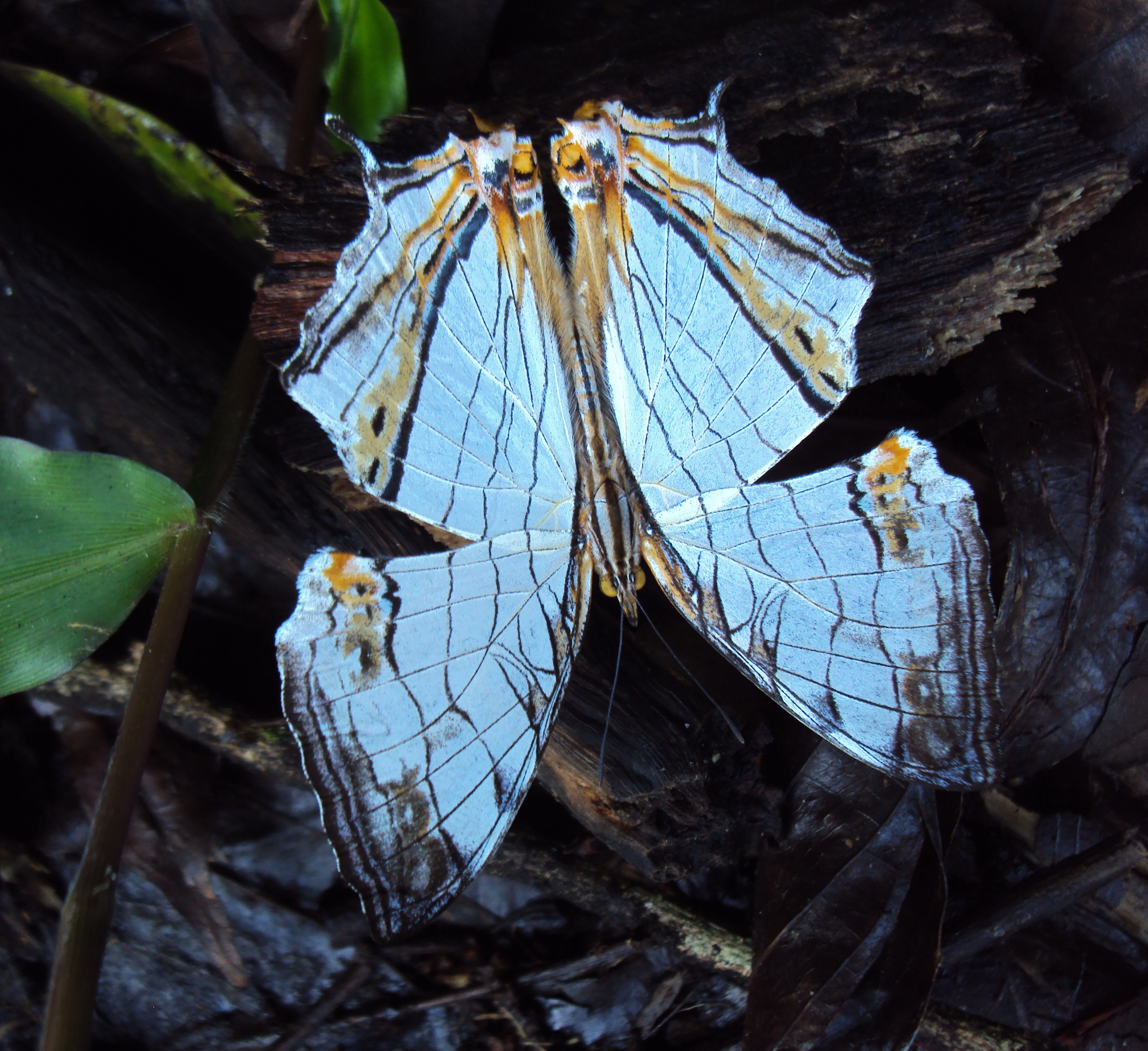

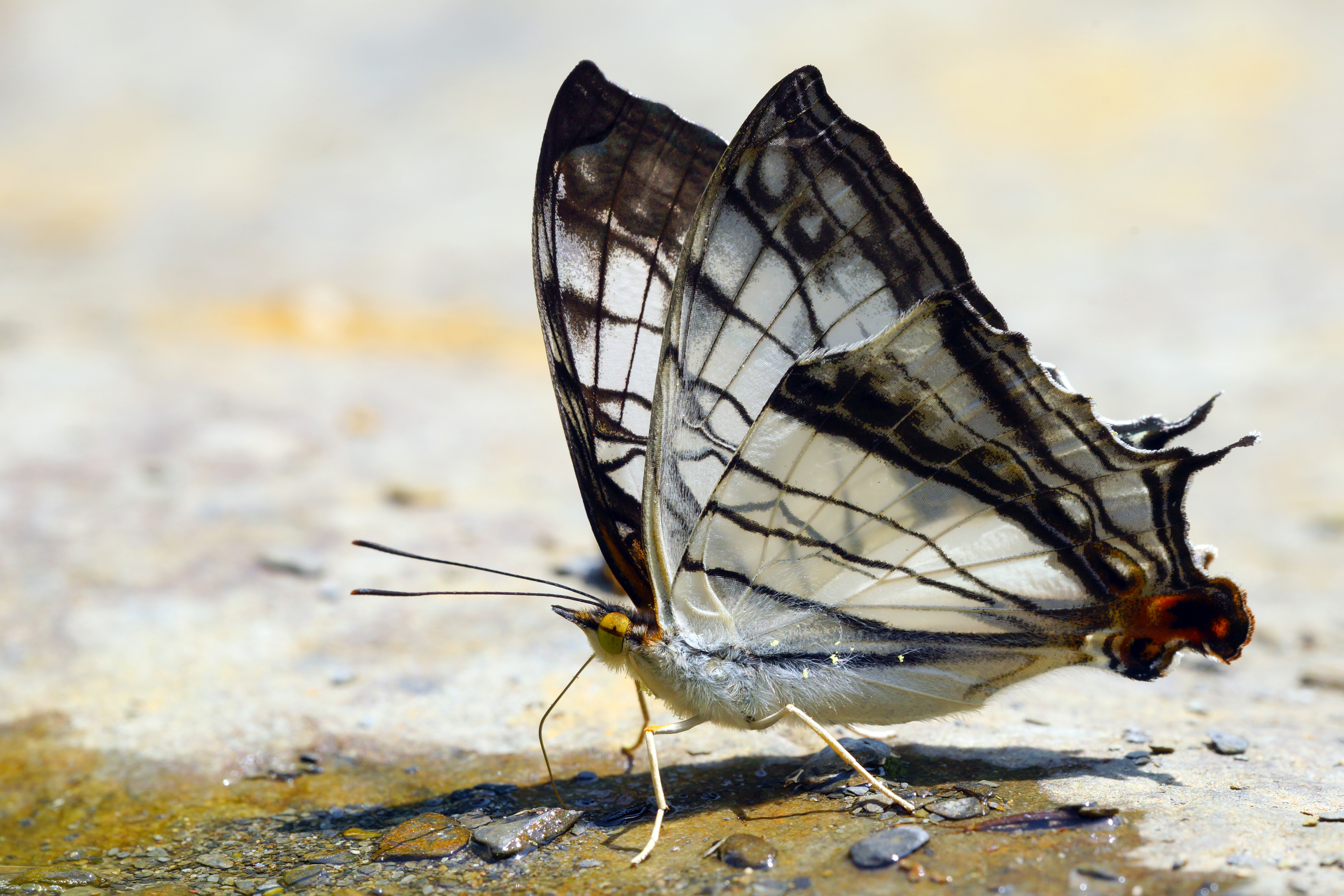

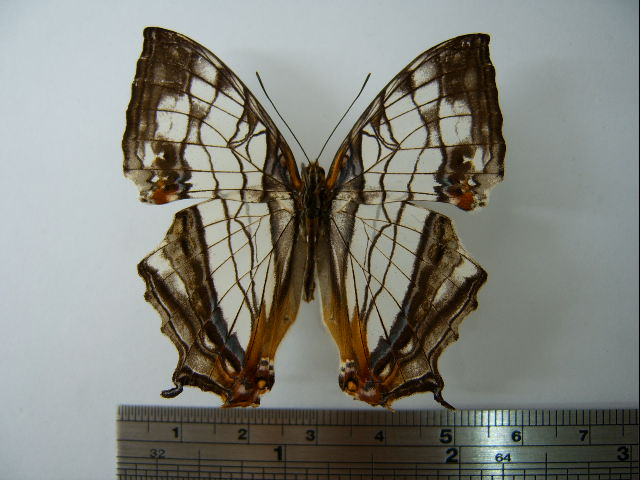

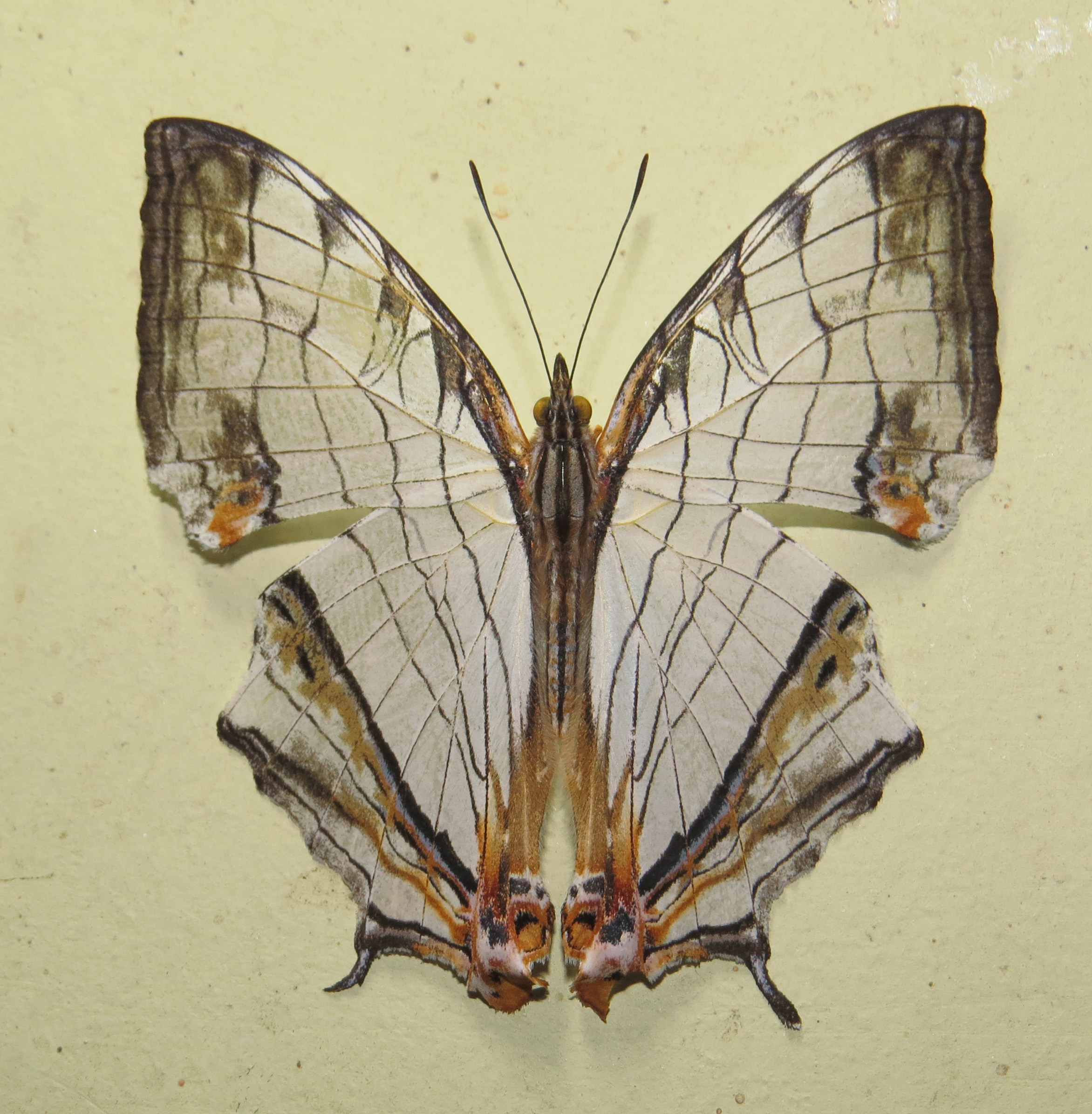
