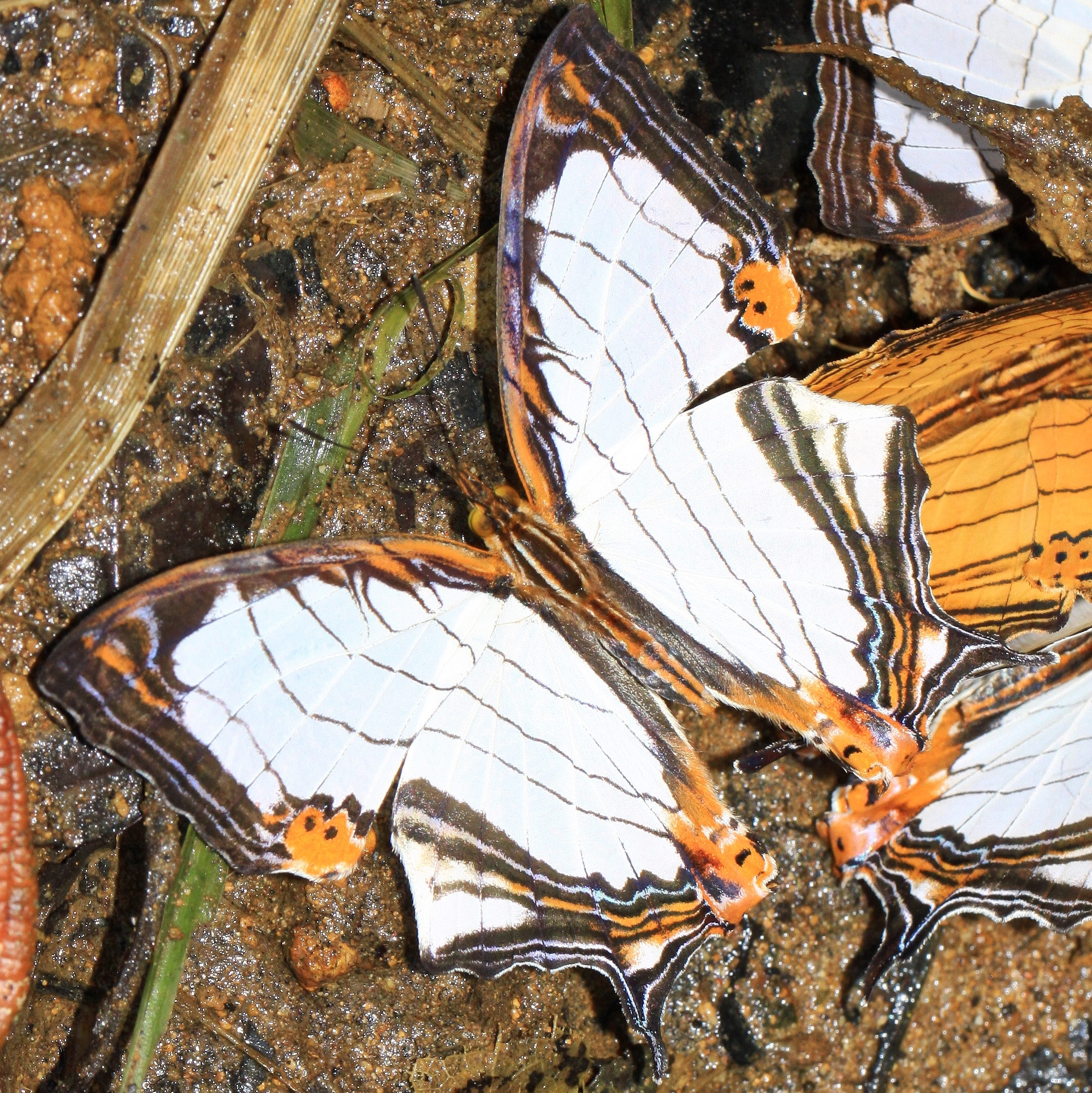

Scientific classification
- Kingdom: Animalia
- Phylum: Arthropoda
- Clade: Pancrustacea
- Class: Insecta
- Order: Lepidoptera
- Family: Nymphalidae
- Genus: Cyrestis
- Species: C. nivea

Binomial name
- Cyrestis nivea (Zinken, 1831)

Synonyms
- Amathusia nivea Zinken, 1831; Cyrestis nivalis C. & R. Felder, [1867]

= Cyrestis nivea =

Straight-line map-wing

Species of butterfly

Cyrestis nivea, the straight-line map-wing, is a butterfly of the family Nymphalidae. It is found in South-East Asia. The habitat consists of primary and secondary forest at elevations between sea level and about 500 metres.

== Subspecies ==
- Cyrestis nivea nivea (Java)
- Cyrestis nivea nivalis C. & R. Felder, [1867] (southern Thailand, Peninsular Malaya, Pulau Tioma, Sumatra, Borneo)
- Cyrestis nivea pigmentosa Okubo, 1983
- Cyrestis nivea superbus Staudinger (Palawan)
- Cyrestis nivea fadorensis Kheil (Nias)
- Cyrestis nivea tonkiniana Fruhstorfer, 1901 (northern Indo-China)
- Cyrestis nivea baliensis Martin (Bali)
- Cyrestis nivea fruhstorferi Röber (Kangean Island)
- Cyrestis nivea sumbawana Martin (Sumbawa)
