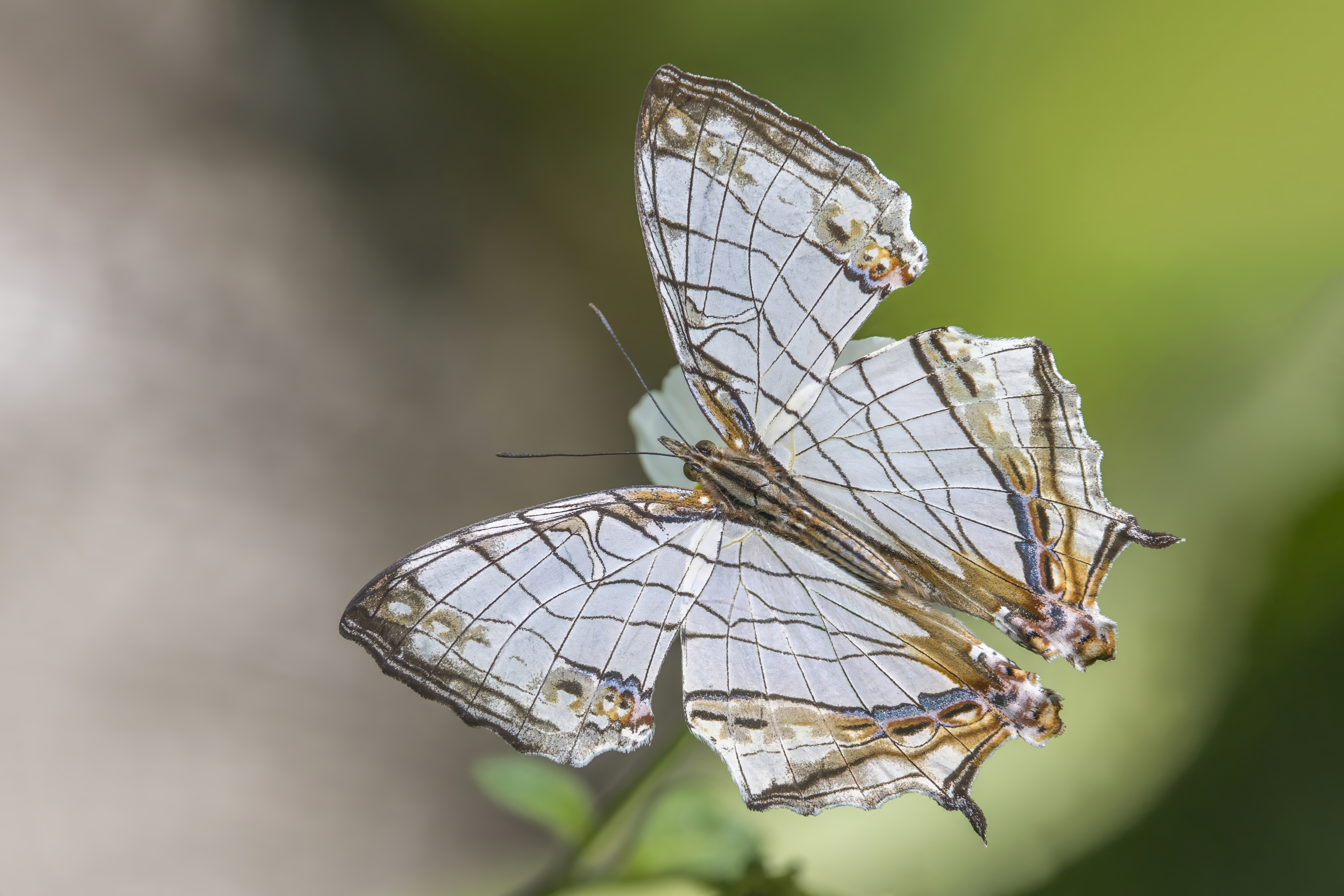
- male C. thyodmas formosana

Scientific classification
- Kingdom: Animalia
- Phylum: Arthropoda
- Class: Insecta
- Order: Lepidoptera
- Family: Nymphalidae
- Subfamily: Cyrestinae
- Genus: Cyrestis; Boisduval, 1832

Species
- See text

Synonyms
- Apsithra Moore, [1899]; Sykophages Martin, 1903; Azania Martin, 1903

= Cyrestis =

Genus of brush-footed butterflies

Cyrestis is a butterfly genus in the family Nymphalidae. They are known as map butterflies, so named because the wing-markings of some species resemble the lines of latitude and longitude of a world map. Cyrestis is a widespread genus ranging from Africa to parts of the Indomalayan realm and parts of the Australasian realm (New Guinea).

== Description ==
The following characteristics apply to all the species of Cyrestis. They are very delicate and strikingly coloured with exceedingly tender and thin, but unusually large wings whose surface is out of all proportion with the slightly-built, slender and delicate body. The eyes are large, prominent and naked; palpi long, pointed, beak-like, slightly curved upwards, resembling those of the genus Libythea. The principal and most striking markings found on both wings in all the species consist in finer or coarser blackish bands running parallel to the body and at right angles to the longitudinal axis of the wings; of these bands always three unite on each wing to form a broader submarginal fascia. In the white-coloured species these bands or streaks are so fine that, in combination with the frequently black veins, they remind one of the meridian lines on a map, which has given rise in British India and the Straits to the popular and expressive name “the Map”.

== Species ==
- Cyrestis achates Butler, 1865
- Cyrestis acilia (Godart, [1824])
- Cyrestis andamanensis Staudinger
- Cyrestis adaemon Godman & Salvin, 1879
- Cyrestis camillus (Fabricius, 1781)
- Cyrestis cassander C. & R. Felder, 1863
- Cyrestis cocles (Fabricius, 1787)
- Cyrestis heracles Staudinger, 1896
- Cyrestis irmae Forbes, 1885
- Cyrestis kudrati Jumalon, 1975
- Cyrestis lutea (Zinken, 1831)
- Cyrestis maenalis Erichson, 1834
- Cyrestis nais Wallace, 1869
- Cyrestis nivea (Zinken, 1831)
- Cyrestis paulinus C. & R. Felder, 1860
- Cyrestis tabula de Nicéville, 1883
- Cyrestis telamon (Linnaeus, 1758)
- Cyrestis themire Honrath, [1884]
- Cyrestis theresae de Nicéville, 1894
- Cyrestis thyodamas Boisduval, 1846
- Cyrestis thyonneus (Cramer, [1779])
