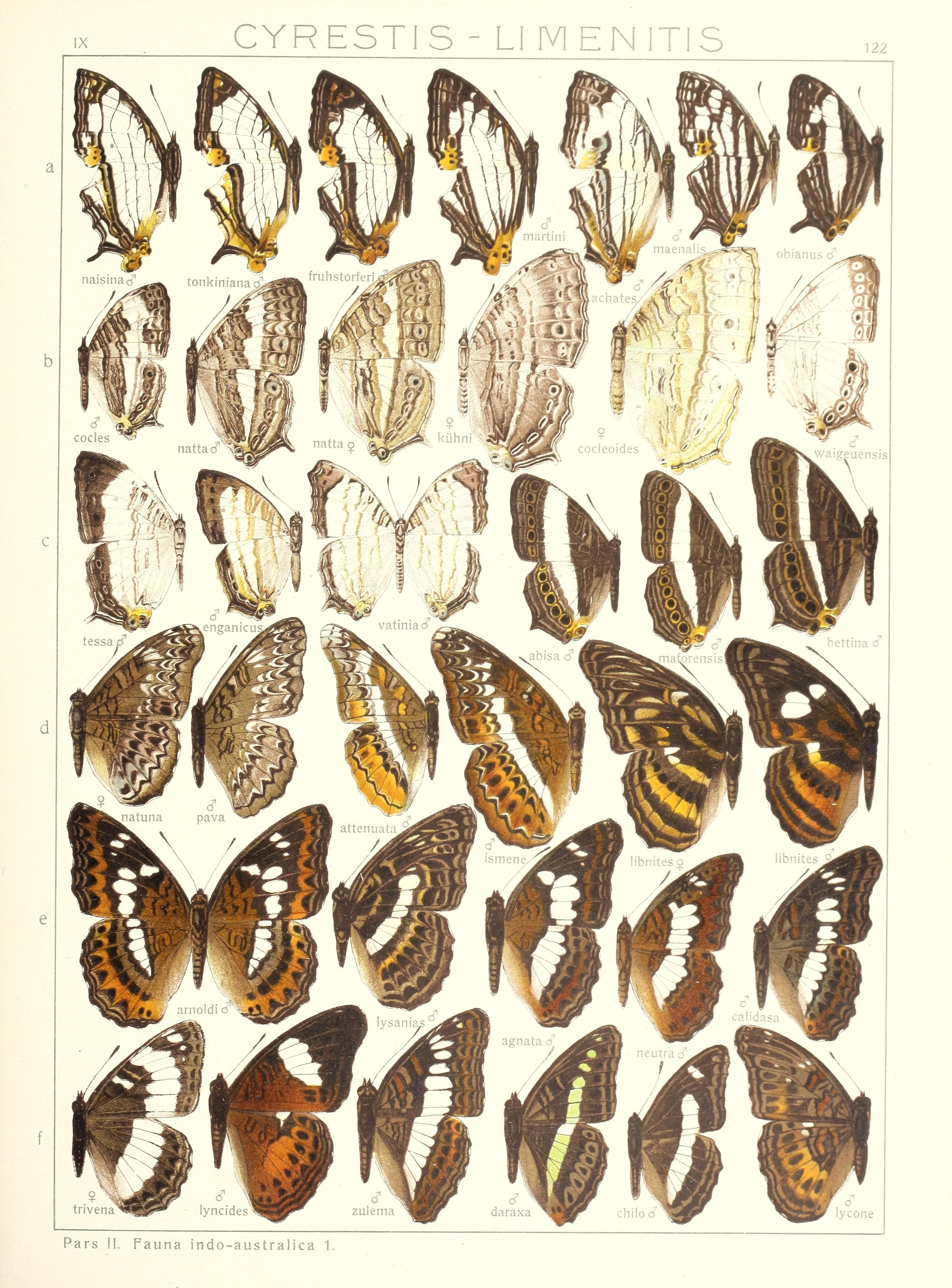
- Cyrestis themire enganica and C. t. vatinia in Seitz Die Großschmetterlinge der Erde 9 Die indo-australischen Tagfalter

Scientific classification
- Kingdom: Animalia
- Phylum: Arthropoda
- Clade: Pancrustacea
- Class: Insecta
- Order: Lepidoptera
- Family: Nymphalidae
- Genus: Cyrestis
- Species: C. themire

Binomial name
- Cyrestis themire Honrath, 1884

= Cyrestis themire =

Species of butterfly

Cyrestis themire is a butterfly of the family Nymphalidae. It is found in the Malay Archipelago.

== Subspecies ==
- C. t. themire Thailand, Peninsular Malaya, Sumatra, Tonkin
- C. t. pemanggilensis Eliot, 1978 Pulau Pemanggil
- C. t. adrianus
- C. t. binghami Martin, 1903 Burma
- C. t. deboeri Kalis, 1941 Bali
- C. t. dohertyi (Moore, [1899]) Sumbawa
- C. t. enganica Fruhstorfer, 1902Enggano
- C. t. horsfieldi (Moore, [1899]) Java
- C. t. siamensis Fruhstorfer, 1898Thailand
- C. t. robinsoni Pendlebury, 1933 Pulau Tioman
- C. t. vatinia Fruhstorfer, 1901 North Indo-China
