= WBKL =

WBKL may refer to:

- WBKL (FM), a radio station (92.7 FM) licensed to Clinton, Louisiana, United States
- WBKL-LP 35, a defunct independent station in Albany, Georgia.
- Labuan Airport (ICAO code WBKL)
