= MASkargo =

Cargo airline of Malaysia

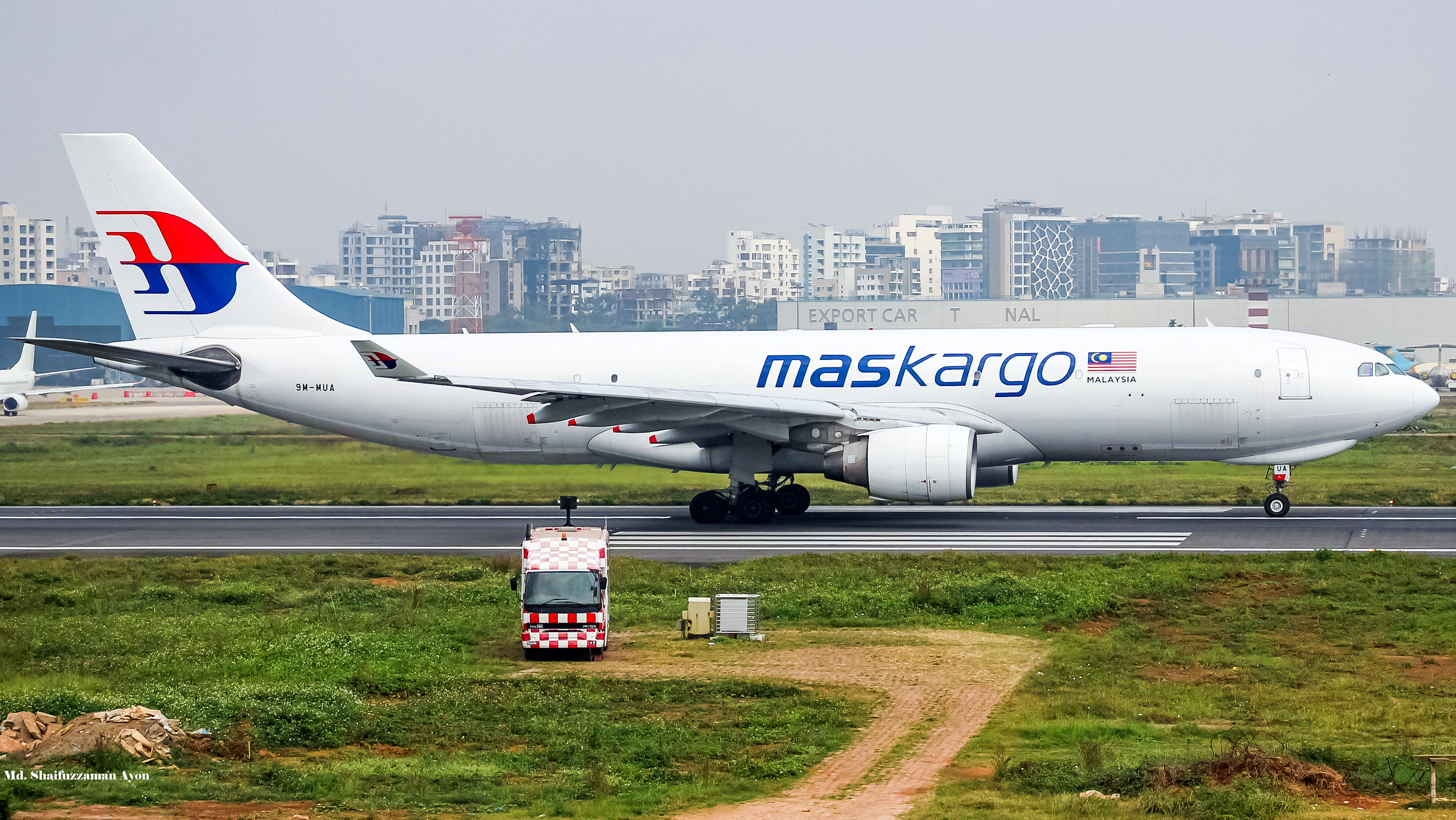
IATA	ICAO	Call sign
MH	MAS	MALAYSIAN CARGO
- Founded: 1 October 1972; 53 years ago
- Hubs: Kuala Lumpur International Airport
- Fleet size: 3
- Destinations: 20
- Parent company: Malaysia Airlines
- Headquarters: Sepang, Selangor, Malaysia
- Key people: Mark Jason Thomas(CEO)
- Website: www.maskargo.com

MAB Kargo Sdn Bhd (d.b.a MASkargo; stylised as maskargo) is a cargo airline with its head office in the Advanced Cargo Centre (ACC) on the grounds of Kuala Lumpur International Airport (KLIA) in Sepang District, Selangor, Malaysia. It is the cargo division of its parent company Malaysia Airlines (MAS) that operates scheduled, charter air cargo services as well as airport to seaport cargo logistics via ground transportation.

== History ==
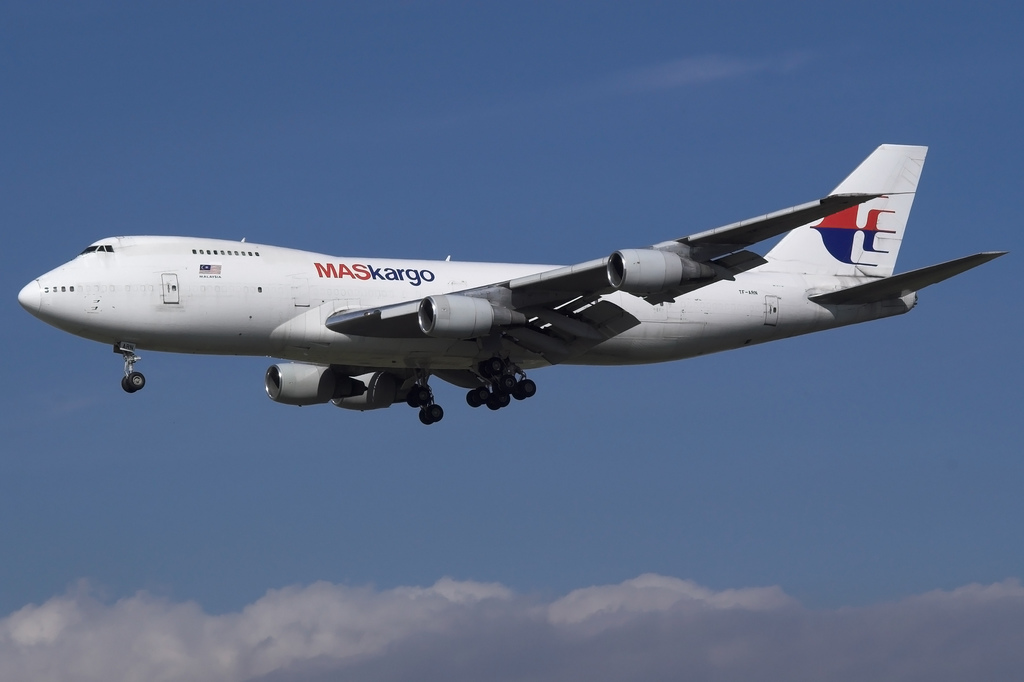
MASkargo Boeing 747-200F, registration TF-ARN, operated by Air Atlanta Icelandic

The company was established in 1972 to handle cargo delivery worldwide via Malaysia Airlines' global network of routes. At that point, MASkargo handled 30,000 tonnes of cargo. It became a subsidiary of Malaysia Airlines in April 1997, with two Boeing 747-200F freighters from the parent company. It has 1,092 employees (as of March 2007). As of 2008, the new cargo facility is located in the Advanced Cargo Centre (ACC) KLIA. MASkargo has a million-tonne cargo capacity.

In 2010, MASkargo, the cargo division of Malaysia Airlines, updated its branding to a more simplified design, diverging from the more colorful scheme of its parent company. The new livery adopted a minimalist approach, featuring a predominantly white color scheme with the company's logo and titles on the tail. This design approach, while officially adopted in 2010, had been intermittently used since the 1990s, particularly on aircraft that were leased from other carriers.

In 2010, Malaysia Airlines placed orders for two Airbus A330-200Fs for MASkargo to operate. An addition of two more aircraft were ordered six months after. One of which was eventually withdrawn from use in 201, leaving the current fleet of three airframes.

On 30 April 2015, Malaysia Airlines announced it would either lease out or sell MASkargo's entire fleet due to its ongoing financial crisis. On 1 November 2015, Malaysia Airlines CEO told reporters that MASkargo would not be shut down.

In March 2016, the renamed MAB Kargo signed an agreement with Silk Way Airlines of Azerbaijan, which sees it use block space on Silk Way flights from Kuala Lumpur to Amsterdam via Baku, thus ending its freighter aircraft service to Europe via the Middle East countries where it had served Dubai's Al Maktoum International Airport.

In October 2016, both Boeing 747-400 planes were phased out, and a third Airbus A330-200F, which was stored for six months, was added to the fleet.

== Destinations ==
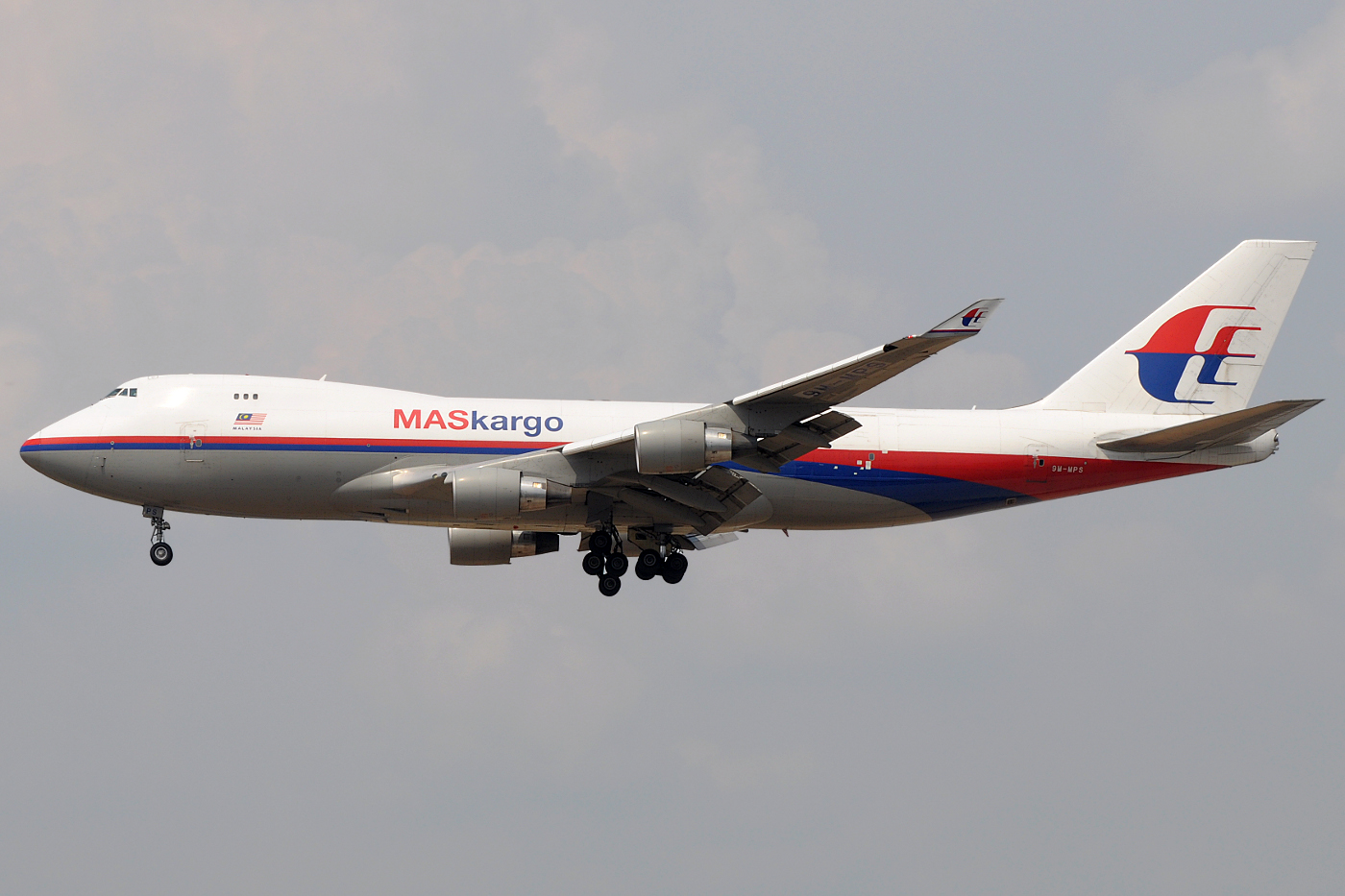
MASkargo Boeing 747-400F, registration 9M-MPS, in previous livery

As of June 2025, MASkargo provides freighter services to the following destinations:

Country	City	Airport	Notes	Refs
Australia	Adelaide	Adelaide Airport		
Australia	Perth	Perth Airport	Terminated	
Australia	Sydney	Sydney Airport		
Bangladesh	Chittagong	Shah Amanat International Airport	Terminated	
Brunei	Bandar Seri Begawan	Brunei International Airport		
China	Chongqing	Chongqing Jiangbei International Airport	Terminated	
China	Guangzhou	Guangzhou Baiyun International Airport		
China	Shanghai	Shanghai Pudong International Airport		
Hong Kong	Hong Kong	Hong Kong International Airport		
India	Bengaluru	Kempegowda International Airport	Terminated	
India	Chennai	Chennai International Airport		
India	Delhi	Indira Gandhi International Airport	Terminated	
India	Mumbai	Chhatrapati Shivaji Maharaj International Airport		
Japan	Tokyo	Narita International Airport	Terminated	
Macau	Macau	Macau International Airport	Terminated	
Malaysia	Kota Kinabalu	Kota Kinabalu International Airport		
Malaysia	Kuala Lumpur	Kuala Lumpur International Airport	Hub	
Malaysia	Kuching	Kuching International Airport		
Malaysia	Labuan	Labuan Airport		
Malaysia	Penang	Penang International Airport		
Malaysia	Sibu	Sibu Airport	Terminated	
Netherlands	Amsterdam	Amsterdam Airport Schiphol		
Netherlands	Maastricht	Maastricht Aachen Airport		
Papua New Guinea	Port Moresby	Jacksons International Airport ^{Charter}	Terminated	
Philippines	General Santos	General Santos International Airport ^{Charter}	Terminated	
Philippines	Manila	Ninoy Aquino International Airport		
South Korea	Seoul	Incheon International Airport		
Taiwan	Taipei	Taoyuan International Airport		
Thailand	Bangkok	Suvarnabhumi Airport		
United Arab Emirates	Dubai	Al Maktoum International Airport		
United States	Los Angeles	Los Angeles International Airport	Terminated	
Vietnam	Hanoi	Noi Bai International Airport		
Vietnam	Ho Chi Minh City	Tan Son Nhat International Airport		

Amsterdam is also served in a block space agreement by Silk Way West Airlines and Jakarta through the same by Raya Airways.

== Fleet ==
=== Current fleet ===
As of August 2024, MASkargo operates the following aircraft:

MASkargo fleet
Aircraft	In service	Order	Notes
Airbus A330-200F	3	—	
Total	3	—	

== Products and services ==
=== I-PORT ===
With MASkargo's recent “an airport within a seaport” plan, the company has extended its services to Port Klang, a major seaport in Peninsular Malaysia. A designated air zone has been established in Port Klang to facilitate this. In collaboration with MASkargo and Port Klang Terminal Operators, the I-port aims to promote Port Klang/KLIA as the load centre for sea and air traffic in the region.

The I-port transfers cargo from the seaport in Port Klang to MASkargo's Advanced Cargo Centre. Any additional documentation from the seaports is sealed by the Customs Department and loaded onto MASkargo's scheduled trucks for outbound destinations through KLIA. Cargo space and flights for the intended airport of destinations are pre-booked by forwarding agents at the MASkargo Air-Zone online handling office, known as "XPQ", situated within the port's Northport Container Yard Terminal. I-PORT is listed in the Malaysian Guinness Book of Records as the first service "of its kind" in Malaysia.

=== i-secure ===
i-secure is an airport-to-airport logistics facility from MASkargo. Cargo under this service will be stored in a surveillance area before being transported. Types of cargo supported by i-secure include semiconductor products, consumer electronics, cameras, CD-ROMs, computers, watches, and pharmaceutical items. i-secure is currently available at Malaysia Airlines stations worldwide.

=== Animal Hotel (AVI) ===
Opened in 1998, the same year KLIA (Kuala Lumpur International Airport) began operations, the MASkargo Animal Hotel started as a centre catering to inbound animal shipments for staging and delivery. On 15 June 2004, the Animal Hotel became a one-stop centre. The activities included import, export and transhipment delivery and payment.

The MASkargo Animal Hotel has around 1,297 m^{2} (14,000 sq ft) of space. The facility is open 24 hours a day. An on-call veterinarian is available. The MASkargo Animal Hotel emphasizes comfort, safety and hygiene.

=== Priority Business Centre ===
MASkargo's Priority Business Centre is serving by-invitation-only customers. PBC is open 24 hours a day. The facility is located on the Core 2 Ground Floor of MASkargo's Advanced Cargo Centre in KLIA and is staffed by a team of supervisors and officers.

=== Perishable Centre ===
The perishable centre was set up by MASkargo to ensure that perishable cargo remains preserved; the one-stop centre accepts and delivers the perishable cargo under one roof. MASkargo provides an “unbroken cool chain" for cooling conditions. Cargo is moved to cold rooms, where up to 16 units of ULD may be stored.

== Notes ==
- Malaysia Airlines; (2002). Malaysia Airlines Cabin Crew Manual: Introduction to Malaysia Airlines. Kuala Lumpur: Flight Operations.
- Berita Pulse; (October 2006). Berita Pulse, October 2006. Kuala Lumpur: Communications Division, Malaysia Airlines.
- Berita Pulse; (August 2006). Berita Pulse, August 2006. Kuala Lumpur: Communications Division, Malaysia Airlines.
- Berita Pulse; (July 2006). Berita Pulse, July 2006. Kuala Lumpur: Communications Division, Malaysia Airlines.
- Berita Pulse; (June 2006). Berita Pulse, June 2006. Kuala Lumpur: Communications Division, Malaysia Airlines.
- "MASkargo: Corporate Info". Retrieved 31 October 2006.
- Going Places; (August 2006). Going Places, August 2006. Kuala Lumpur: Communications Division, Malaysia Airlines.
- "AeroMalaysia: Malaysia Airlines: Current fleet". Retrieved 31 October 2006.
- "AeroMalaysia: Malaysia Airlines: Former Fleet". Retrieved 31 October 2006.
