= Kuala Lumpur International Airport =

Airport in Sepang, Selangor, Malaysia

Kuala Lumpur International Airport Lapangan Terbang Antarabangsa Kuala Lumpur

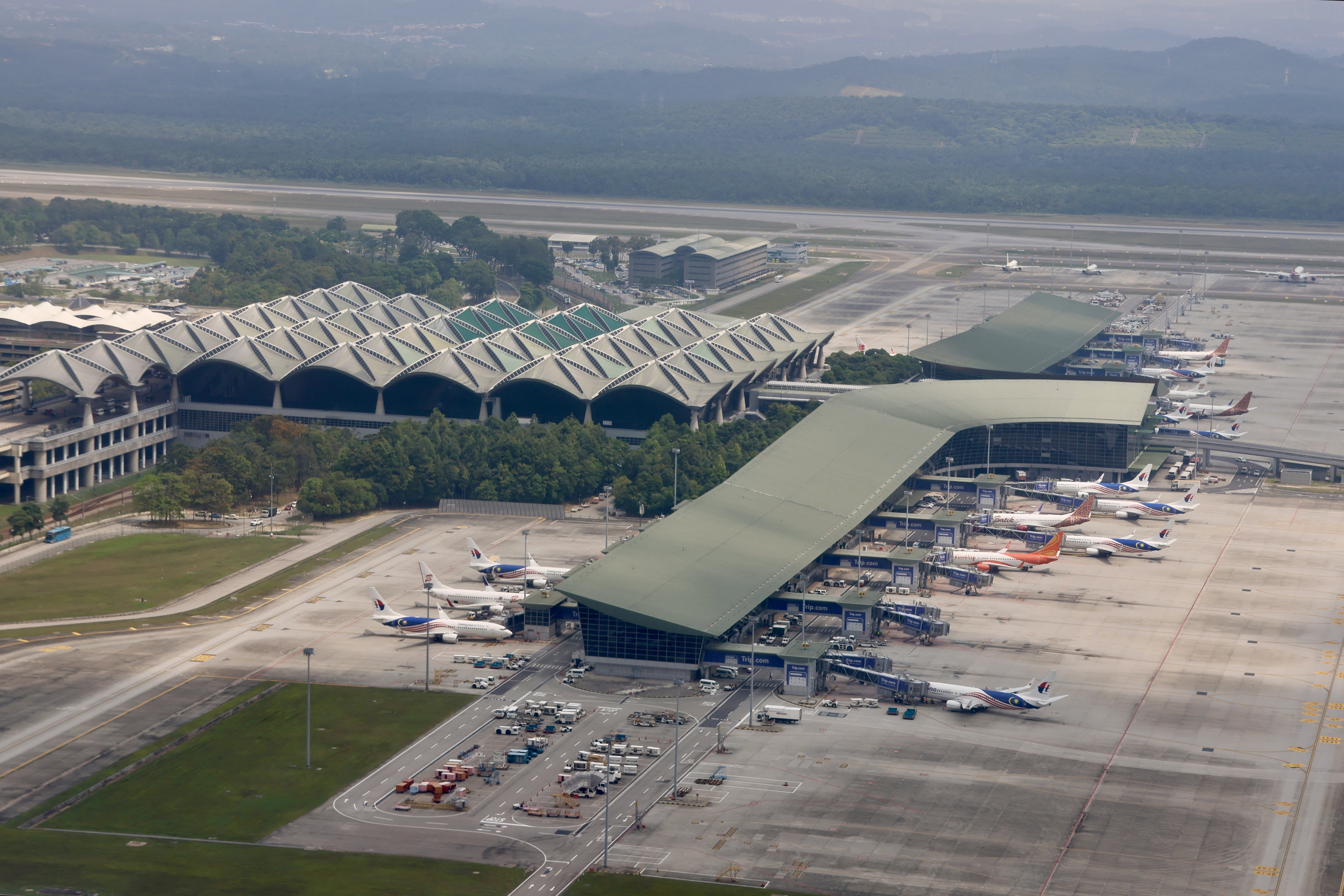
- Aerial view of a part of Kuala Lumpur International Airport
- IATA: KUL; ICAO: WMKK; WMO: 48650

Summary
- Airport type: Public
- Owner: Khazanah Nasional
- Operator: Malaysia Airports
- Serves: Greater Kuala Lumpur
- Location: Sepang, Selangor, Malaysia
- Opened: 27 June 1998; 28 years ago
- Hub for: Batik Air Malaysia; Malaysia Airlines; MASkargo; Raya Airways; World Cargo Airlines
- Operating base for: AirAsia; AirAsia X
- Time zone: MST (UTC+08:00)
- Elevation AMSL: 21 m (69 ft)
- Coordinates: 02°44′36″N 101°41′53″E
- Website: malaysiaairports.com.my

Maps
- Location in Sepang, Selangor, Malaysia KUL/WMKK (Malaysia) KUL/WMKK (Southeast Asia) KUL/WMKK (Asia)
- Interactive map of Kuala Lumpur International Airport

Runways
Direction	Length		Surface
Direction	m	ft	Surface
14L/32R	4,019	13,186	Asphalt
14R/32L	4,000	13,123	Asphalt
15/33	3,960	12,992	Asphalt

Statistics (2025)
- Passengers: 63,121,653 (▲9.68%)
- Domestic passengers: 17,750,058 (▲14.51%)
- International passengers: 45,371,595 (▲7.79%)
- Aircraft movements: 408,154 (▲10.58%)
- Cargo (tonnes): 638,910 (▼24.42%)
- Sources: MAHB CAPA

Kuala Lumpur International Airport (KLIA; IATA: KUL, ICAO: WMKK) is the main international airport of Malaysia. It is located in the Sepang District of Selangor, approximately 45 km (28 mi) south of Kuala Lumpur, serving the city and the Klang Valley. KLIA is the largest and busiest airport in the country and a regional megahub for low-cost carriers in Asia-Pacific. In 2025, it handled 63.3 million passengers, ranking as the 20th-busiest airport by total passenger traffic.

AirAsia is the dominant air carrier in Malaysia, based in KLIA Terminal 2 and serving 14,583 low-cost connections, with a 35% share of flights, followed by Malaysia Airlines. The airport is operated by Malaysia Airports (MAHB) Sepang Sdn Bhd and is the major hub of Malaysia Airlines, MASkargo, Batik Air Malaysia, UPS Airlines and World Cargo Airlines, and the operating base for AirAsia and AirAsia X.

In 2024, KLIA was ranked first by OAG (by ratio of connection flight frequency to destinations served) in the Global Low-Cost Megahubs index by 11,188 possible low-cost connections across over 137 destinations. OAG also ranked KLIA as the world's second most connected airport (by ratio of connection flight frequency to destinations served) in 2024, with 33,411 possible connections, according to the OAG Megahub Index, second to London–Heathrow and followed by Tokyo–Haneda, Amsterdam and Seoul–Incheon in the top five.

== History ==
=== Background ===
The groundbreaking ceremony for Kuala Lumpur International Airport (KLIA) took place on 1 June 1993 when the government under Mahathir Mohamad decided that the existing Kuala Lumpur airport, then known as Subang International Airport (now Sultan Abdul Aziz Shah Airport) could not handle future demand. The construction of the airport was done mainly by a few state-owned construction companies as well as Ekovest Berhad – helmed by Tan Sri Datuk Lim Kang Hoo. It was created as part of the Multimedia Super Corridor, a grand development plan for Malaysia. The chief architect who designed the new airport terminal was the Japanese architect Kisho Kurokawa.

Upon KLIA's completion, Subang Airport's Terminal 1 building was demolished. Malaysia Airports agreed to redevelop the remaining Terminal 3 to create a specialist airport for turboprop and charter planes surrounded by a residential area and a business park. The IATA airport code KUL was transferred from Subang Airport, which handled limited low-cost airline service, turboprops, aircraft maintenance, repair and operations (MRO), general aviation and military aircraft after the switch, and recently resumed its own jets operation in 2024.

=== Current site ===
The airport's site spans 100 square kilometres (39 sq mi) of former agricultural land and is one of the world's largest airport sites. An ambitious three-phase development plan anticipates KLIA to have three runways and two terminals each with two satellite terminals. Phase One involved the construction of the main terminal and one satellite terminal, giving a capacity of 25 million passengers, and two full service runways. The Phase One airport had 60 contact piers, 20 remote parking bays with 80 aircraft parking positions, four maintenance hangars and fire stations. Phase Two, designed to increase capacity to 35 million passengers per year, is largely complete. Phase Three is anticipated to increase capacity to 100 million passengers per year.

=== Inauguration ===
Kuala Lumpur International Airport was officially inaugurated by the tenth Yang di-Pertuan Agong, Tuanku Ja'afar of Negeri Sembilan, on 27 June 1998, shortly before the 1998 Commonwealth Games.

The inauguration of the airport was marked with numerous problems. The aerobridge and bay allocation systems broke down, with queues building up throughout the airport and baggage handling failing. Bags were lost, and there were waits of over five to seven hours. Most of these issues were remedied eventually, though the baggage handling system was plagued with problems until it was put up for a complete replacement tender in 2007.

The airport suffered greatly reduced traffic with the general reduction in economic activity brought about by the 1997 Asian financial crisis, September 11 attacks, SARS, bird flu epidemic (Avian flu), the 2008 financial crisis, the 2009 swine flu pandemic and the COVID-19 pandemic. The airport is also largely overshadowed by the more internationally renowned Changi Airport located approximately 300 kilometres (190 mi) to the southeast in Singapore, due to a lack of connecting flights served by the airports, especially to European aviation hubs.

The first year of opening immediately saw reduction of passenger numbers as some airlines, including All Nippon Airways (resumed on 1 September 2015), British Airways (reinstated on 28 May 2015 until 28 March 2021, and again since April 2025), Lufthansa (resumed between 28 March 2004 until 28 February 2016 and returning on 25 October 2026) discontinued their flights. Qantas moved their Sydney-Kuala Lumpur route to its low-cost subsidiary Jetstar, which continued to operate the route until 2008. Aeroflot terminated their Moscow-Kuala Lumpur via Singapore route in 2001, although there had been discussions about Aeroflot resuming the Kuala Lumpur route, no progress was made, and Northwest Airlines terminated their loss-making route from Osaka to Kuala Lumpur in 2001. KLIA's first full year of operations in 1999, in its Phase One manifestation (capacity of 25 million passengers per year), saw only 13.2 million passengers. Passenger numbers eventually increased to 21.1 million in 2004 and 47 million in 2013 — though short of the originally estimated 25 million passengers per year in the first phase between 1999 until 2008.

=== Rebranding ===
On 9 February 2023, transport minister Anthony Loke Siew Fook announced that the government and MAHB had agreed to rebrand KLIA and klia2 to KLIA Terminal 1 and KLIA Terminal 2 respectively. The costs associated with the rebranding will be fully borne by MAHB.

== Runways ==
Airport layout

Kuala Lumpur International Airport has three parallel runways (14L/32R; 14R/32L; 15/33), all three of which are over 3,800 metres (12,500 ft) long and 60 metres (200 ft) wide. The length of Runway 14L/32R is 4,019 metres (13,186 ft), runway 14R/32L is 4,000 metres (13,000 ft), while runway 15/33 is 3,960 metres (12,990 ft).

The current three runway system is capable of handling 78 landings per hour and was expected to increase to 108 landings per hour once upgrading of the Kuala Lumpur Flight Information Region had been completed in 2019. The airport has CAT II Precision Landing ILS (runways 14L/32R and 14R/32L) to guide landing aircraft safely under all weather conditions with visibility as low as 350 metres (1,150 ft) whilst runway 15/33 has CAT I Precision Landing ILS that guide safe landings under all situations with lowest possible visibility at 900 metres (3,000 ft). These runways operate on different departure/arrival modes according to the air traffic requirements.

== Operations and infrastructure ==
Kuala Lumpur International Airport features a number of modern design features that assist in the efficient operation of the airport. It is one of the first Asia Pacific airports to become 100% Bar Coded Boarding Pass capable. Malaysia Airlines; AirAsia; MASkargo, a cargo airline; and Malaysia Airports, the Malaysian Airports operator and manager; are headquartered on the property of KLIA. Malaysia Airlines also operates its Flight Management Building at KLIA.

=== Air traffic control tower ===
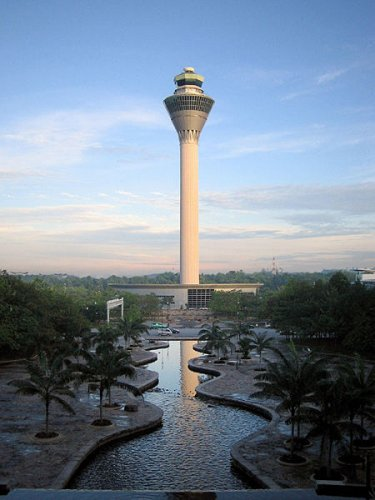
KLIA Tower East control tower

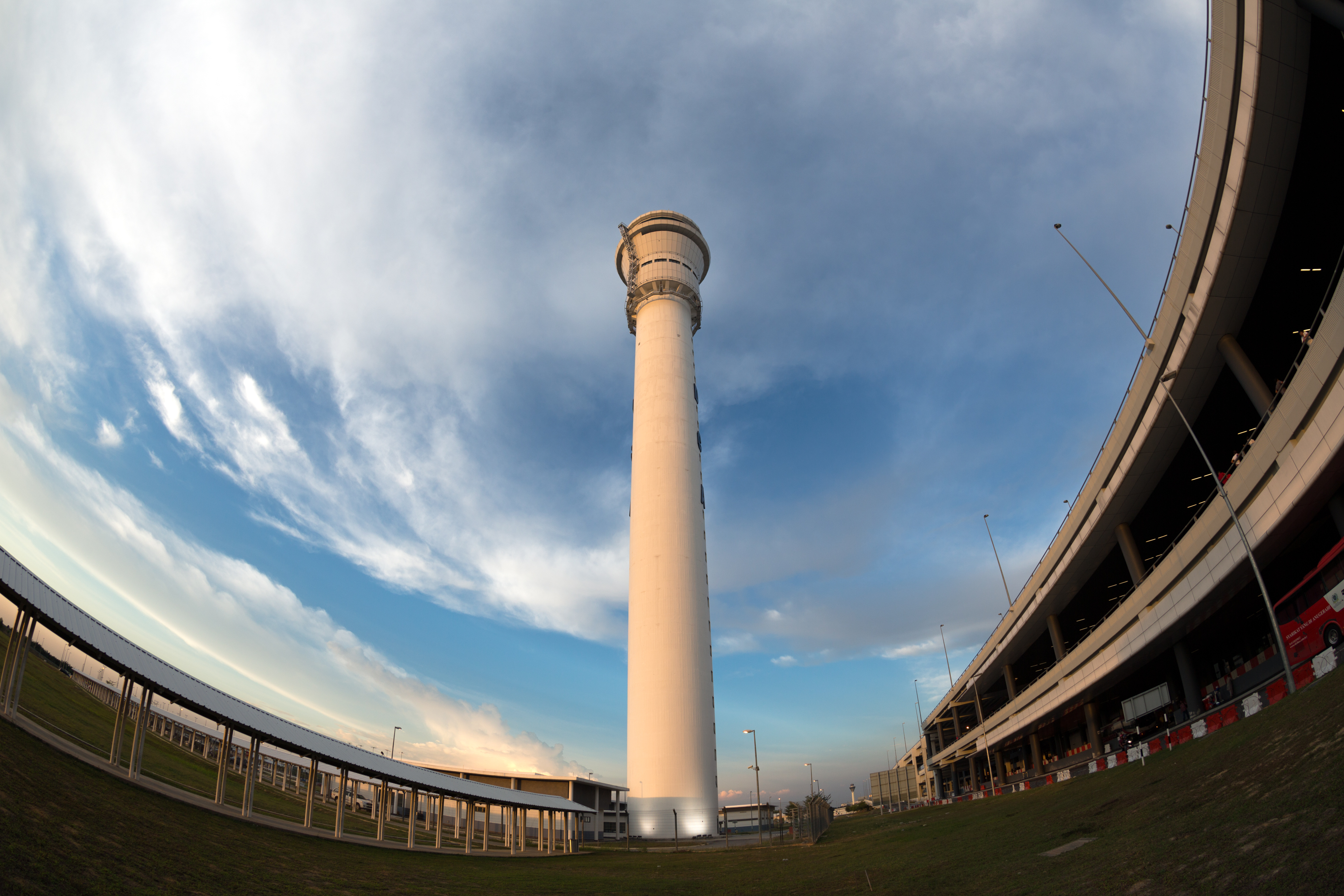
KLIA Tower West control tower

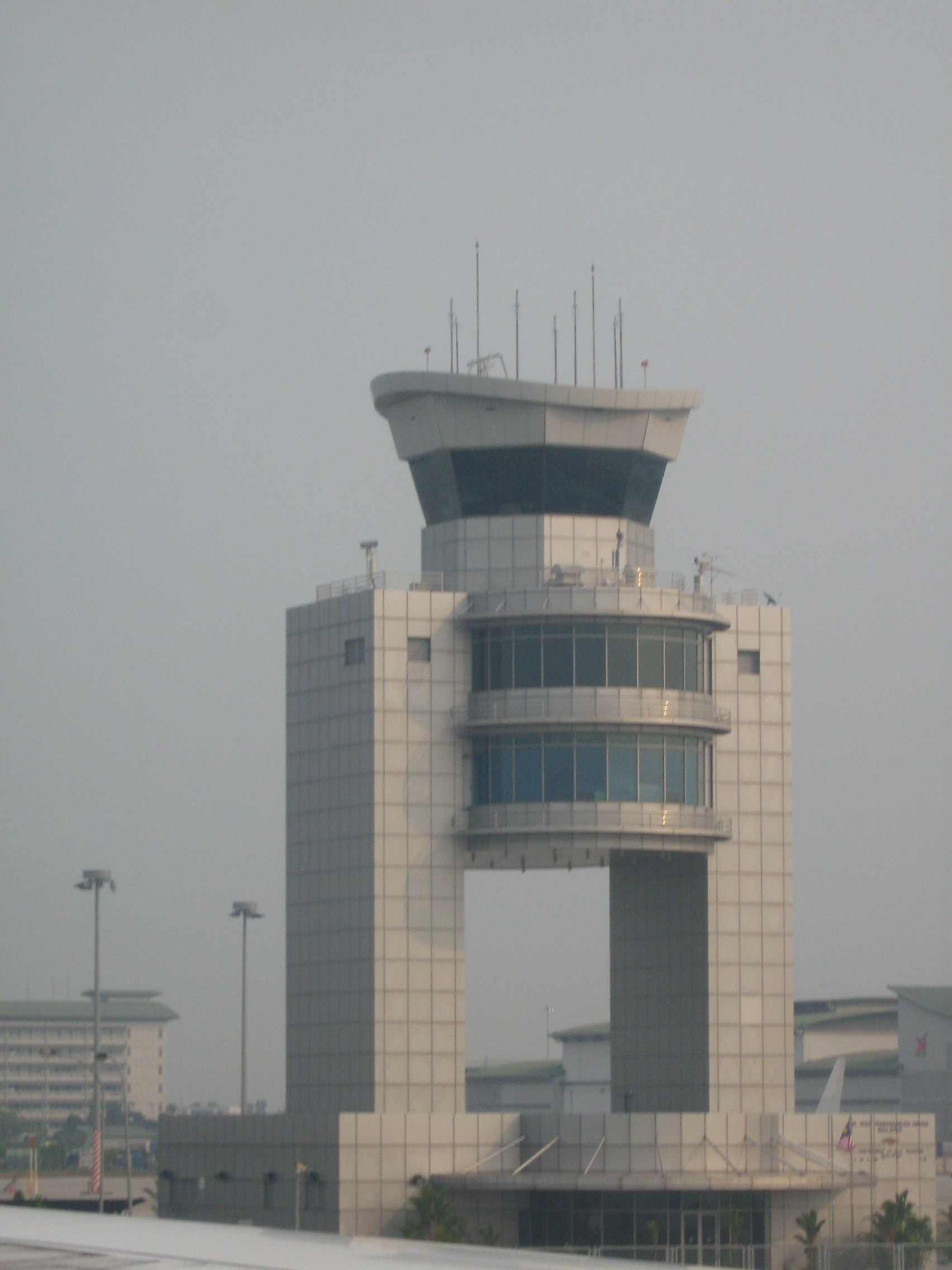
KLIA apron control tower

There are three air traffic control towers at Kuala Lumpur International Airport: the two main control towers (Tower East and Tower West) and the apron control tower. Tower East is the original control tower which has stood since the airport's opening. It is 130 metres tall and controls the traffic of the initial two runways. Tower West is 133.8 metres tall and is the tallest air traffic control tower in the world, followed by those at Suvarnabhumi Airport and King Abdulaziz International Airport. Each tower is shaped like an Olympic torch, and they house the air traffic control systems and radar equipment.

The 55-metre apron control tower is responsible for providing air traffic service to aircraft and vehicle movement in the northern and southern parts of the Satellite Terminal building and the cargo apron areas.

=== Baggage handling system ===
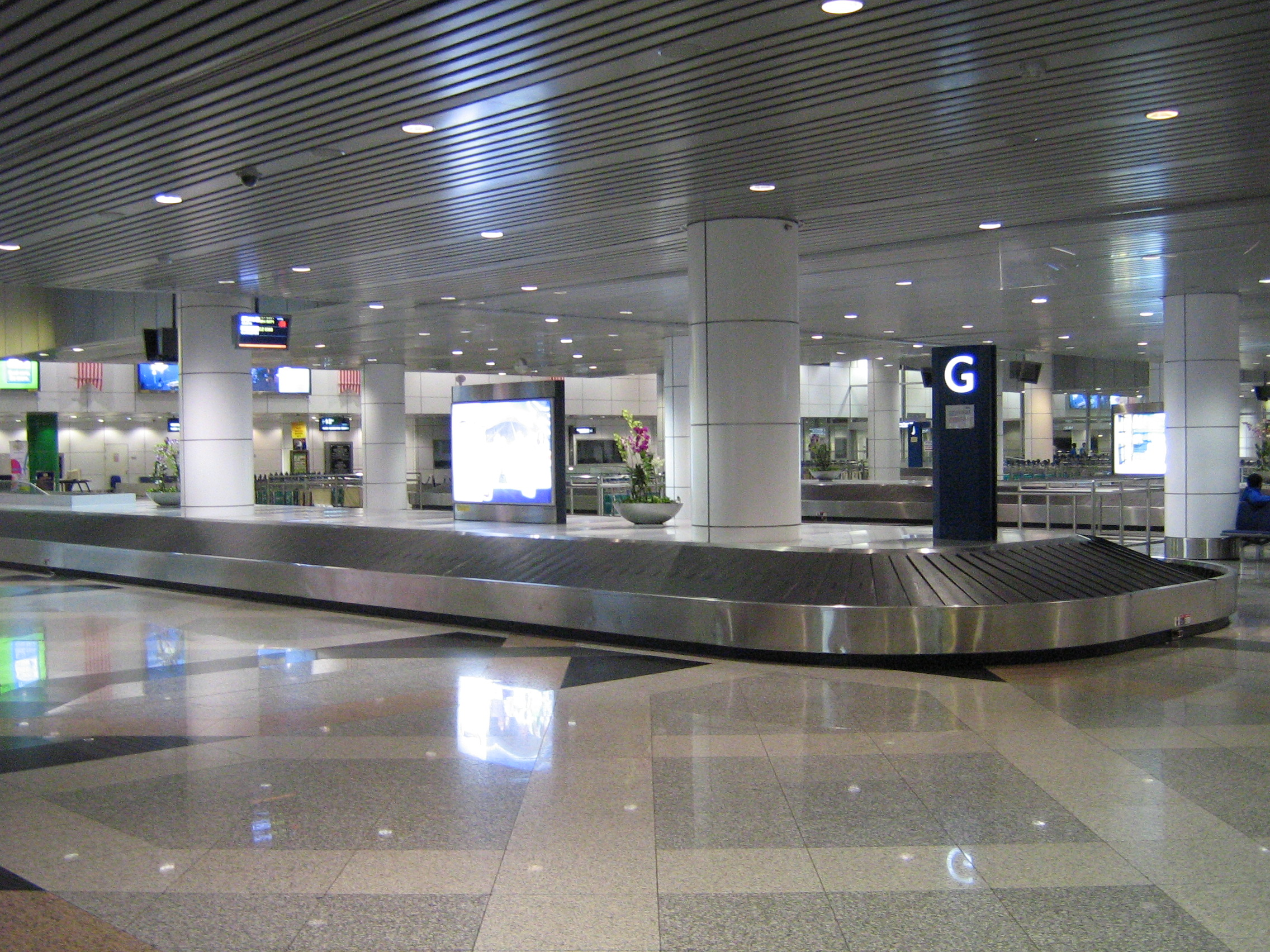
KLIA's conveyor belts

The airport's baggage handling system (BHS) features baggage common check-in at any of the 216 counters on a 24-hour basis and incorporates automatic bar-code sorting control, four level in-line baggage security screening and high speed conveyor belts.

The BHS was built by Toyo Kanetsu with lots of new mechanism such as Belt Carry Sorter, Triplanar, Hinged Diverter, Horizontal Sliding Belt Diverter, and FOD (foreign object debris) Detection System. In 2006, a contract to extend the system from the satellite building to the ERL (Express Rail Link) platform in the Main Terminal Building was awarded to Siemens. The new system from Siemens will transport baggage between the two terminals at speeds of up to 36 km per hour, compared to the previous rate of 7.2 km per hour. The new system uses a high-speed tray conveyor system in which bags are placed on individual trays for better control and tracking at high speed compared to conventional belt conveyors enables the baggage to be checked-out in KL Sentral once the operator of KLIA Express, ERL Berhad introduce the new facility.

Facilities of the baggage handling system in Terminal 1 include:

- Eight short-term car park baggage check-in counters
- Eight bus and train stations baggage check-in counters
- Three stage baggage security screening system
- Early check-in baggage storage (1,200 bags capacity)
- 17 baggage reclaim carousels together with LCCT
- 33 km total length of conveyor belts
- Part of the belts travel through a 1.1 km tunnel from the Main Terminal Building to the Satellite Building.

Meanwhile, in Terminal 2, the baggage handling system being implemented by BCS Group from Norway and upgraded by Daifuku Airport Technologies From Japan until its opening in May 2014, costing RM 60 million. The BHS in Terminal 2 is as follows:

- 128 check-ins
- Over 10 km in aggregate length for over 1,200 conveyors
- Over 2 km in aggregate length for 21 carousels
- CCTV system for the complete baggage system
- Two High speed tilt tray sorters
- 14 inline screening X-ray machines on the conventional baggage system plus 5 for the out of gauge lines
- 250 barcode readers
- EBS infrastructure for early bags

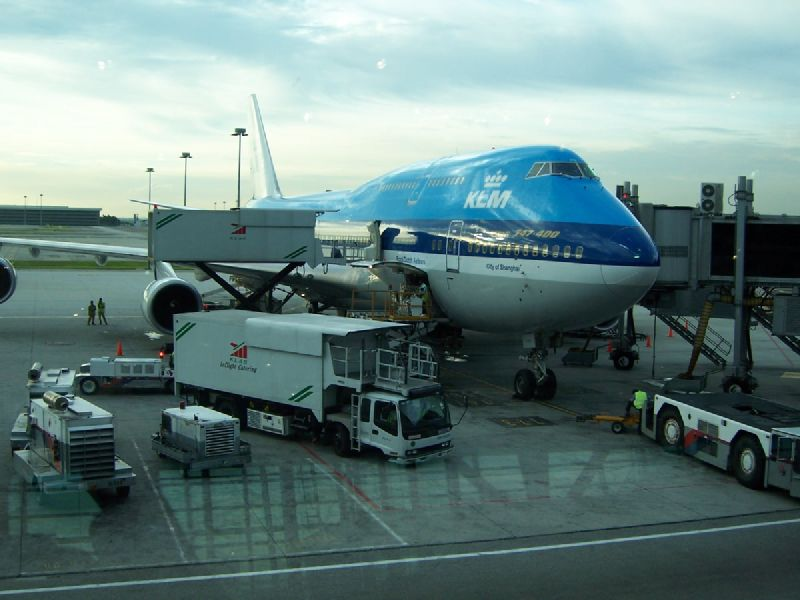
Ground handling of a KLM Combi 747

Several companies handle the baggage systems in KLIA. For the homebase airlines, Malaysia Airlines operates the BHS through AeroDarat Services, AirAsia uses Ground Team Red, and Malindo has their own baggage crews. There are also two more baggage handlers operate under Kuala Lumpur Airport System (KLAS) which are Pos Aviation and ProSky Services.

IATA had agreed to facilitate the usage of RFID tags between KLIA and Hong Kong International Airport after the launch of the world's smallest multiband RFID chip in Kuala Lumpur. KLIA will be the second airport to use RFID. The RFID baggage tagging trial between KLIA and Hong Kong International Airport is completed. Baggage tags are being issued at both Malaysia Airlines and Cathay Pacific check-in counters. The trial was delayed due to problems obtaining printers. Furthermore, KLIA is now awaiting reports from IATA which scheduled to be released first quarter of 2008.

In 2017, there was a mishap of baggage handling which caused 50 flights delays and affected 1500 passengers which later managed to be solved. The increasing passengers traffics and non-optimized system due to never being replaced gave a signal for MAHB to implement BHS upgrade in 2019 which predictably will cost RM 500-600 million. There are four Bursa Malaysia company with joining in force with six multinational company were competing for the tender. The project was being given to T7 Kemuncak Sdn. Bhd. with the joint venture with Siemens Logistics. The new BHS will provide a boost of extra 2500 bag positions with the new system called VarioTray, which is a high-speed conveyor system connected between the Main Terminal Building and Satellite A, will enable bags to be transferred swiftly and securely between the two buildings.

=== Fire and rescue ===
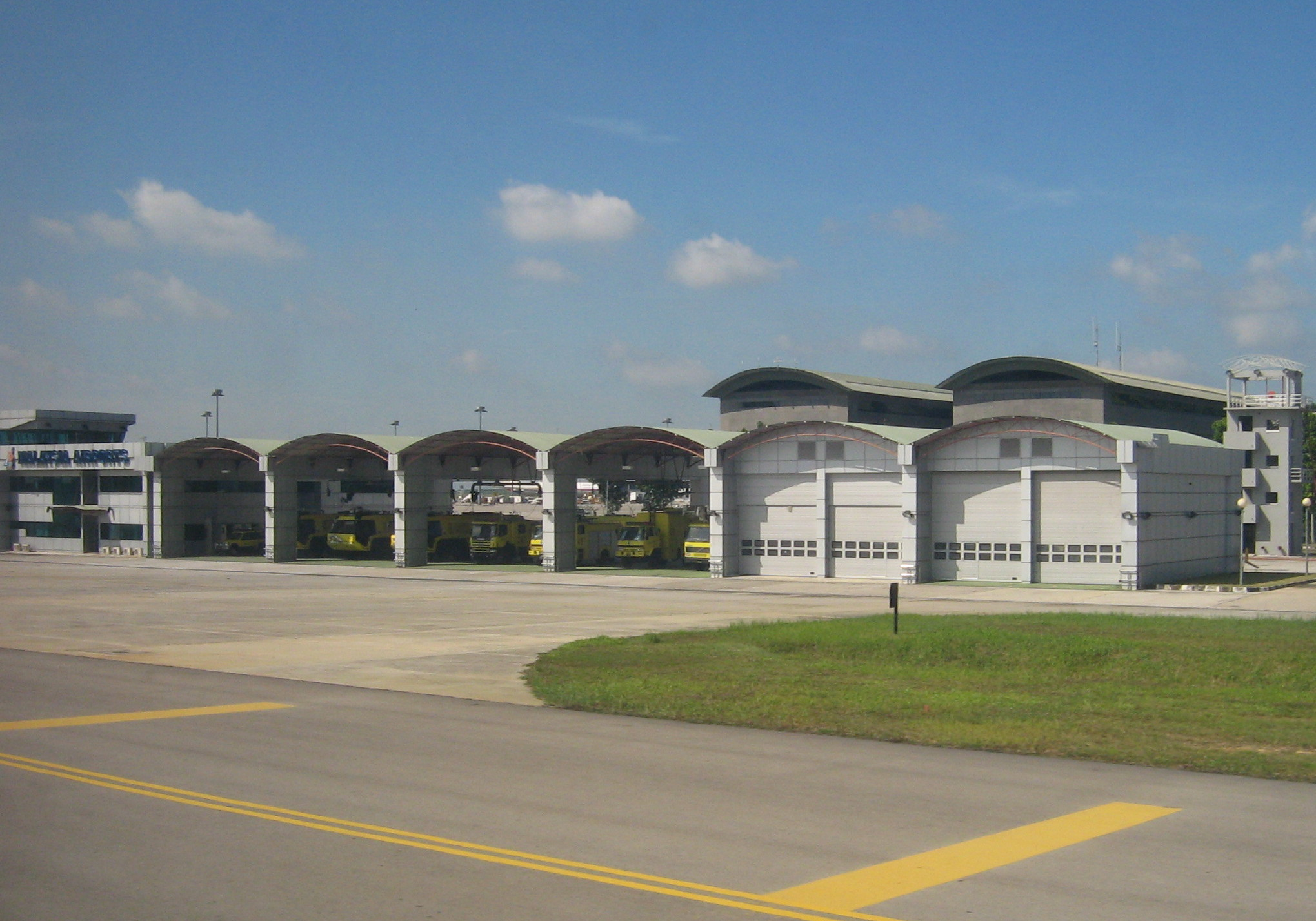
KLIA fire station

KLIA's Airport Fire and Rescue Services (AFRS) rated Category 10 (can handle emergencies involving huge jumbo jets such as Airbus A380, Antonov An-225 and Boeing 747-8) are provided to cope with aircraft accidents. This is important as KLIA itself is categorised as a National Vital Installation Priority 1, representing facilities of the highest importance to national security and the function of government.

There are three fire stations at the airport near each runway, fully equipped with fire and emergency rescue equipment. There are total of 10 Ultra Large Foam Tender, Ziegler 8-(8x8) vehicles costing RM 3.8 million each.

=== Air cargo ===
The KLIA Advance Cargo Center (ACC) covers 44 hectares (108 acres) of land and can handle one million tonnes of cargo per annum, with the capability to expand to 3 million tonnes/year. The center is designed as an integrated transshipment hub within a Free Commercial Zone. Fueled by high economic growth in the Southeast Asian countries and China, the airport handled 677,000 tonnes of air cargo in 2006, a 5.9% growth over the 2005 fiscal year.

To handle the cargo efficiently, the ACC is equipped with the following:

- Container storage system (CSS) – over 2,200 storage positions to accommodate various ULDs with 5ETVs
- Automated storage and retrieval system (ASRS) – 12 units of stacker cranes for 6,500 storage bins
- 60 units of automated electrified monorail linked to 10 units of interfloor hoists
- 28 units airside interface deck
- Two units bypass conveyor system dedicated for SLAC ULD
- Over 100 breakdown and buildup workstations
- Over 100 truck docks
- 13 units fully automated transfer vehicles
- Two units 20 tons bridge cranes
- Odd-sized storage space (OVS)
- Computerised truck dock management system
- Over 14,000 sqm of unit loading devices storage yard
- Automated weighing scale interface with material handling system, maximum capacity 20,000 kg
- ULD and large skid X-ray machines
- 24-hour warehouse surveillance with close to 200 CCTVs

Applying added information technologies, the main operator of the center, MASkargo, with a joint venture with Unisys, introduced various artificial intelligence systems to handle cargo, such as KLIA Community System (KLIACS), to optimize load utilization, routing, and inventory for air cargo, ground handlers, and freight forwarders. the authority also pioneered the DagangNET System, allowing users to conduct trade declarations and apply for permits over the internet and speeding the approval process by controlling authorities. These systems would be incorporated into the Total Airport Management System (TAMS).

According to MAHB, the cargo movement of KLIA was 656,762 tonnes in 2023.

=== Animal hotel ===
The animal hotel is operated by Malaysia Airlines's cargo arm, MASkargo. The hotel operates 24 hours and manages all imports, exports and stop-over transhipments that are related to animals, and offers a pets stay-in program where owners can leave their pets to in the hotel while they are away for vacations mainly at Kuala Lumpur Animal Quarantine Station (KLAQS). At least 500 consignments of livestock are handled per day at the animal hotel.

=== Aircraft maintenance ===
There are four hangars housing facilities to provide aircraft maintenance provided by Malaysia Airlines and Kuala Lumpur Airport Service (KLAS) suitable for Maintenance, Repair and Overhaul (MRO) activities. The airport also has a hangar which is purposely built for the Airbus A380, the first in Southeast Asia. The construction of the hangar was completed in 2007. Asian Digital Engineering, the MRO arm of AirAsia has launched a new 14-line hangar that covers 35,300 sq m on an 8.2ha site that features dedicated workshops, including a composite workshop, sheet metal and machine workshop, upholstery workshop, cabin interior repair workshop and a 3D printing lab for aircraft livery.

=== Meteorological services ===
The Aeronautical Meteorological Station (AMS) is located near Runway 14R-32L which provides weather information for the aviation community in compliance with International Civil Aviation Organization standards. The AMS houses a Meteorological Data Processing System (MDPS) for weather data collection, processing, storage and analytical needs. AMS constantly make weather observations using radiosonde instrument to measure atmospheric profiles such as wind speed, wind direction, pressure, temperature and humidity at every level up to an altitude of about 30 kilometres before issuing aerodrome warnings on adverse weather for protection of aerodrome facilities and aircraft on the ground.

=== Butterfly Effect ===
The Butterfly Effect is a service at KLIA Terminal 1 and Terminal 2 meant to accommodate people with hidden disabilities, such as autism.

== Terminals ==
Terminal overview
Terminal	Opened	Floor area	Handling capacity	Parking bays
Terminal 1 (Main Terminal Building 1 & Contact Pier)	27 June 1998	336,000 m^{2} (3,620,000 sq ft)	5 million passengers per year	20 (aerobridge); 23 (remote)
Terminal 1 (Satellite Terminal A)	27 June 1998	143,404 m^{2} (1,543,590 sq ft)	20 million passengers per year	26 (aerobridge); 15 (remote)
Terminal 2	1 May 2014	257,845 m^{2} (2,775,420 sq ft)	45 million passengers per year	68 (aerobridge); 10 (remote)
Bunga Raya Complex (VIP terminal)	27 June 1998			
Total	-	737,249 m^{2} (7,935,680 sq ft)	70 million passengers per year	114 (aerobridge); 48 (remote)

Kuala Lumpur International Airport comprises two main terminals: the original terminal, Terminal 1, previously known simply as "KLIA"; and the newer Terminal 2 (formerly KLIA2). Terminal 1 was designed by Japanese architect Kisho Kurokawa, who also designed the Domestic Terminal (T2) at Nursultan Nazarbayev International Airport, with an emphasis of natural lighting within the airport complex. Spanning 38.4m along a grid pattern allowing for future expansions, the abstract symbolic architecture by the late Kisho Kurokawa encompasses the Islamic geometry and cutting-edge technology with the tropical rainforest in mind.

=== KLIA Terminal 1 ===
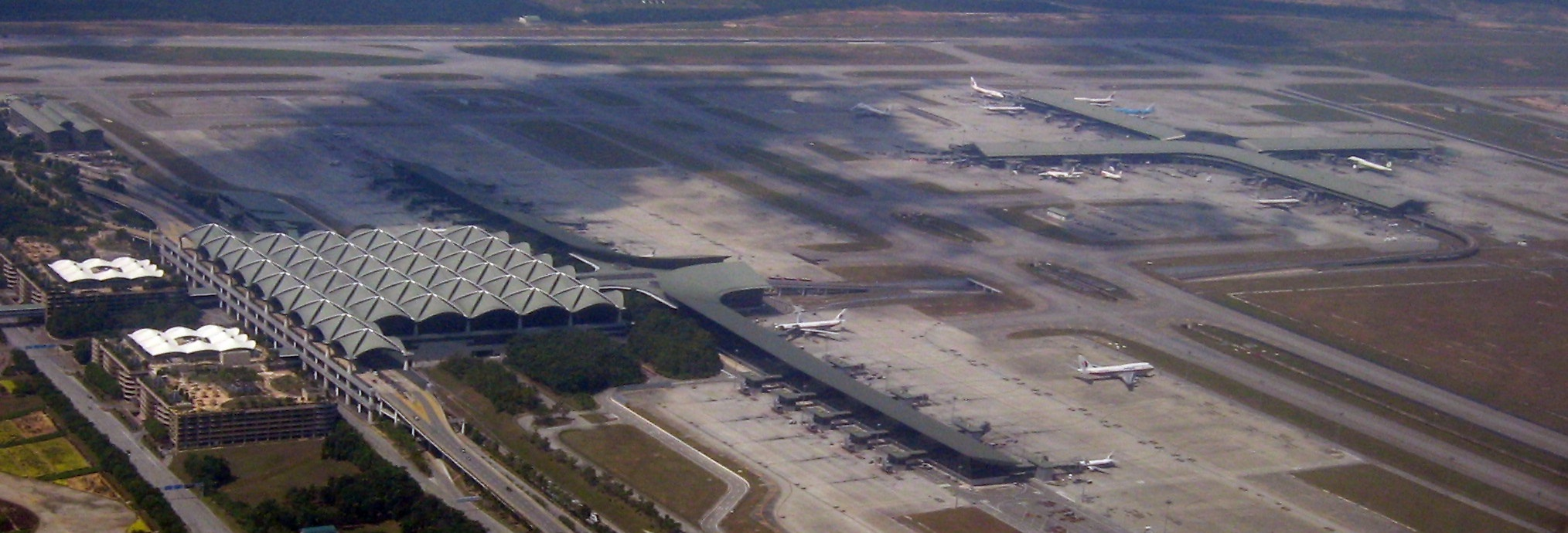
Main Terminal Building and Satellite Terminal A

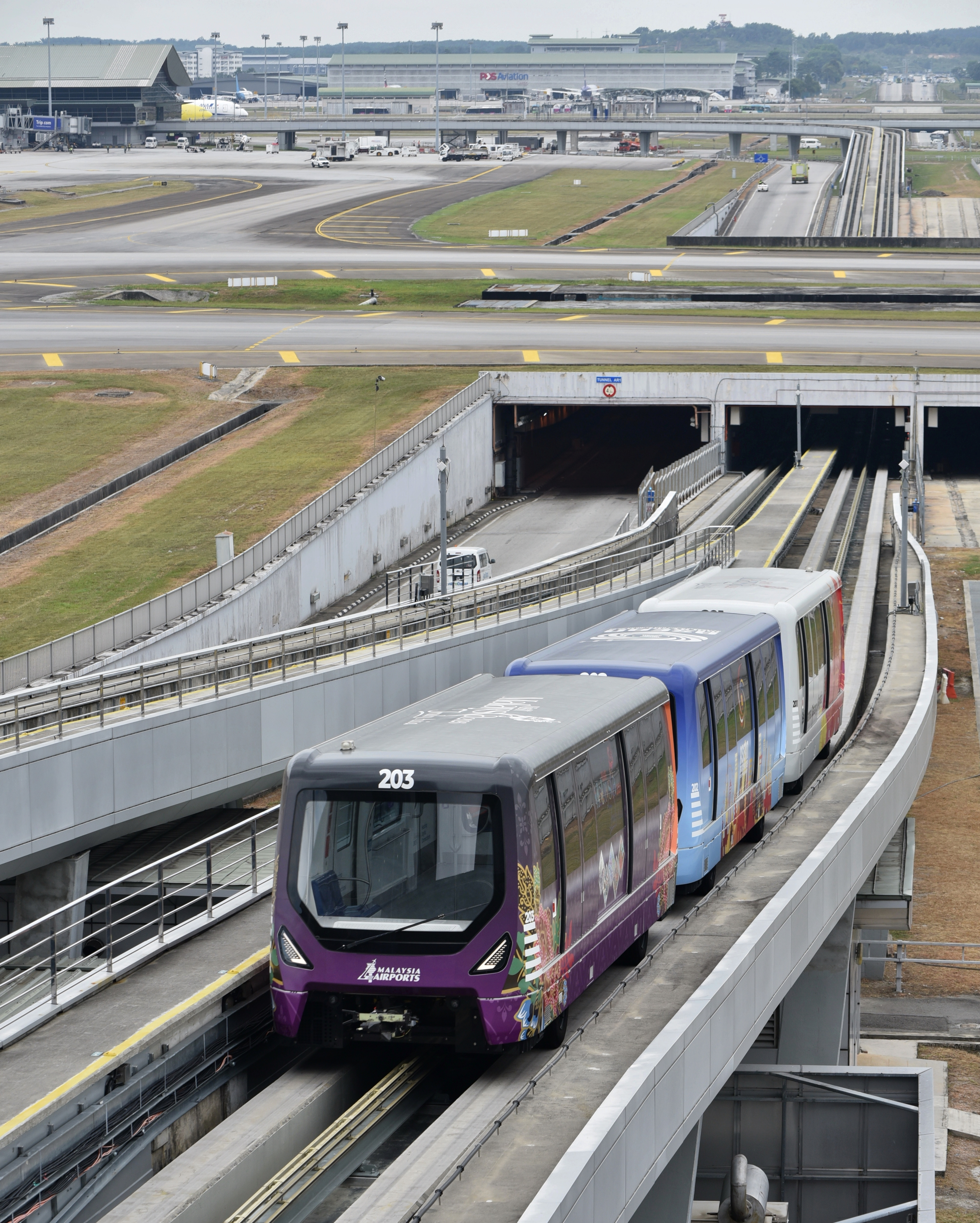
The Aerotrain connects the Main Terminal Building and Satellite Building A

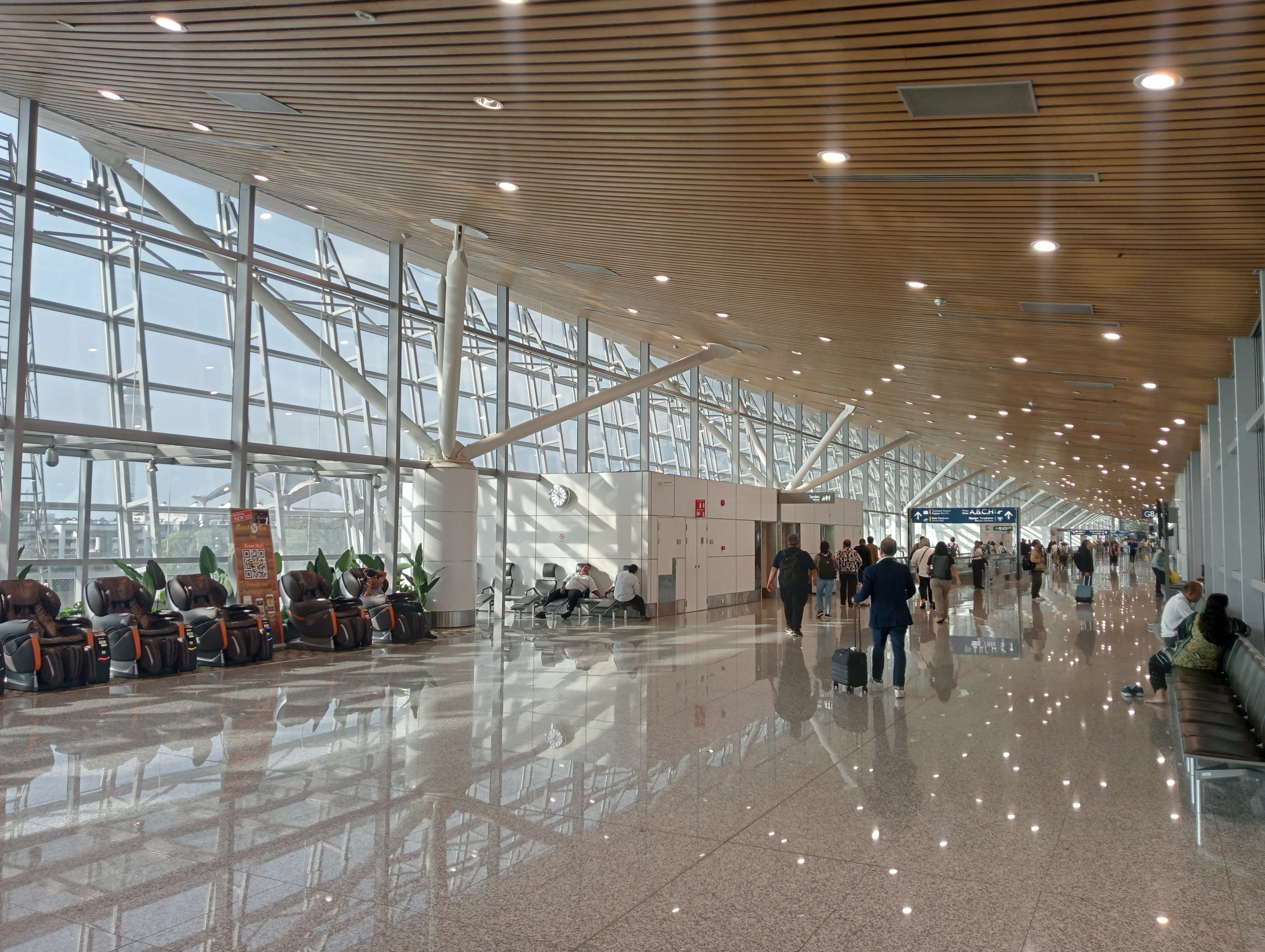
Terminal 1 interior

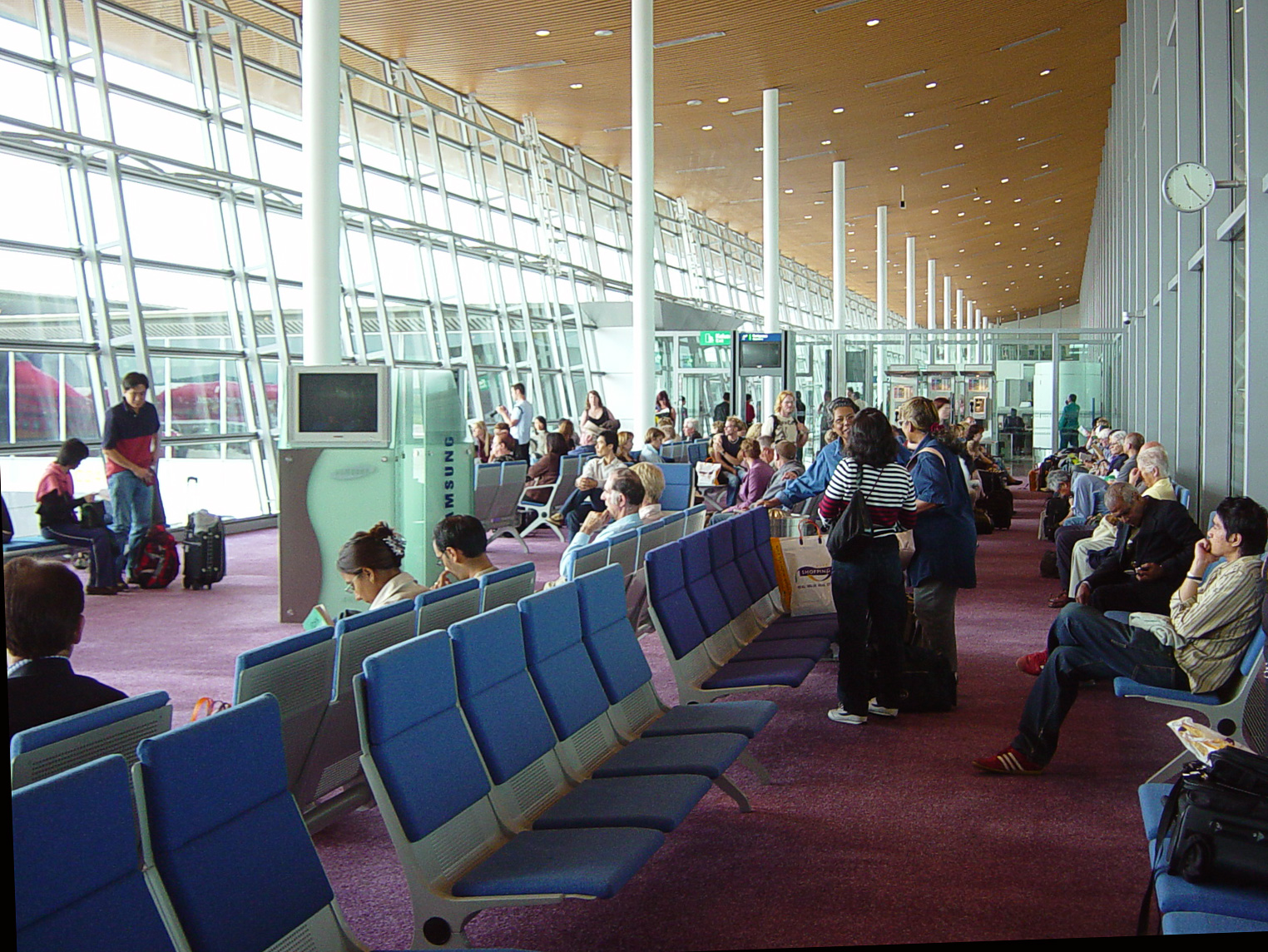
Departure lounge with large windows for light and aircraft viewing)

==== Main Terminal Building ====
The KLIA Main Terminal Building (MTB) now also referred to as KLIA Main is located in between the two runways. The floor area of the terminal covers 390,000 m^{2} (4,200,000 sq ft) and the building consists of 39 square roof units, which enables future expansion of the building. There are a total of 216 check-in counters, located in 6 different islands, identified by the letters A – M (excluding I). Multi check-in services are available, designed for the use of all passengers arriving, departing or in transit. Self check in facilities are available in this airport since 2007, and KLM was the first airline to use the Common-use self-service kiosks. The contact pier is an extension of the main terminal building with gates marked with prefix A and B for domestic departures, G and H for international flights. The gate allocation is based on operational requirements, although it has been observed that Malaysia Airlines has been operating most of its operations out from the contact pier.

==== Satellite Terminal A ====
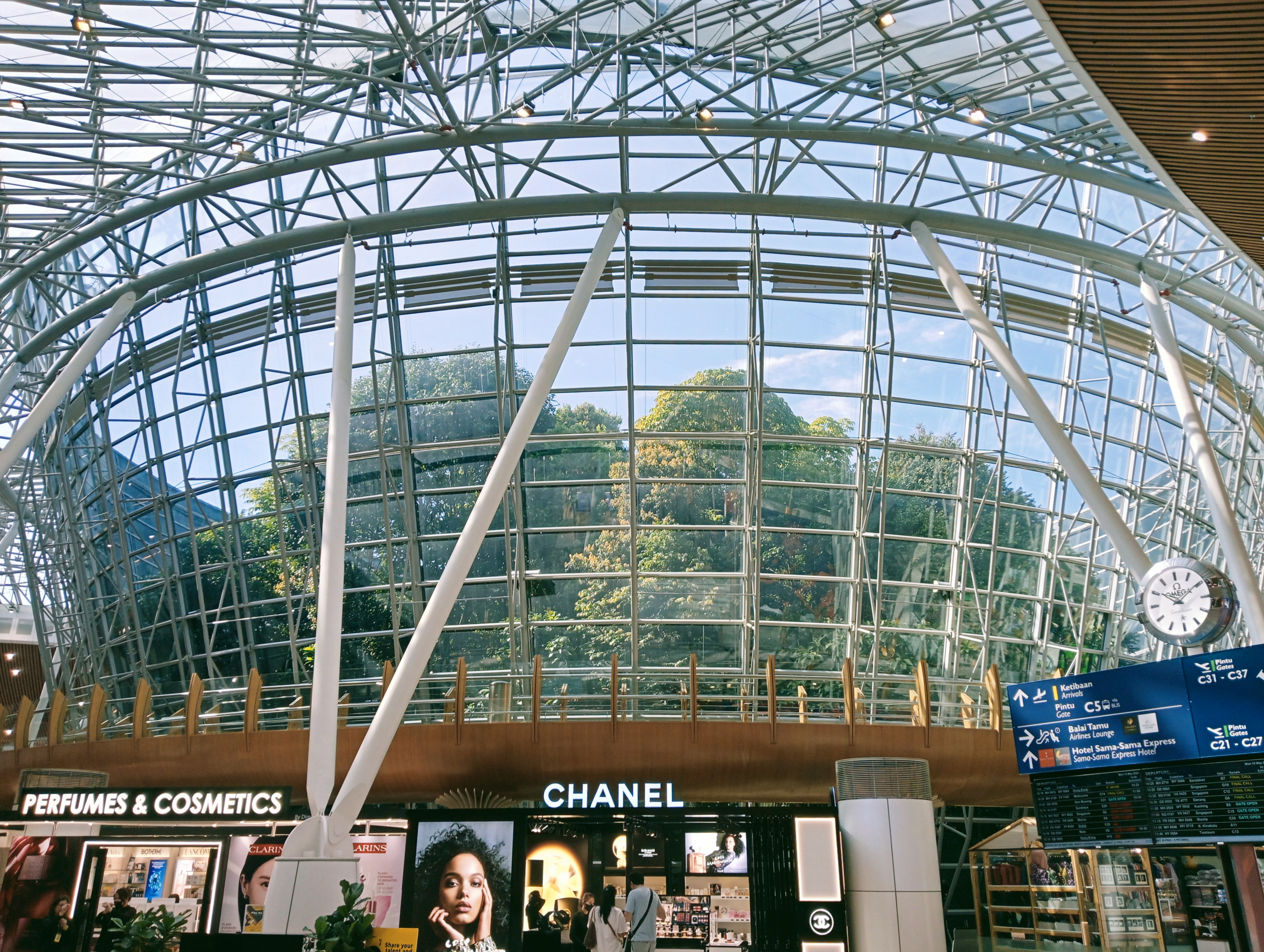
Jungle Boardwalk at the Satellite Terminal

The 176,000-square-metre (1,890,000 sq ft) satellite building accommodates international flights departing and arriving at KLIA T1. Passengers taking flights parked at the satellite terminal are transported by the Aerotrain, that has been fully repaired since 1 July 2025 after two years of maintenance work. It is able to fit a total of 270 passengers and takes 3 minutes to travel from the Main Terminal to the Satellite Terminal. Passengers may also take the bus to the Satellite Station if they wish.

There is a wide array of duty-free shops and prestige brand boutiques in the satellite building. This includes international brands such as Gucci, Longchamp, Montblanc, Salvatore Ferragamo, and Hermès. Among all international labels available within the terminal, some boutiques such as Harrods are only available in the airport, which had been closed since 2018. A number of restaurants and international airlines' lounges are available as well as an Airside Transit Hotel.

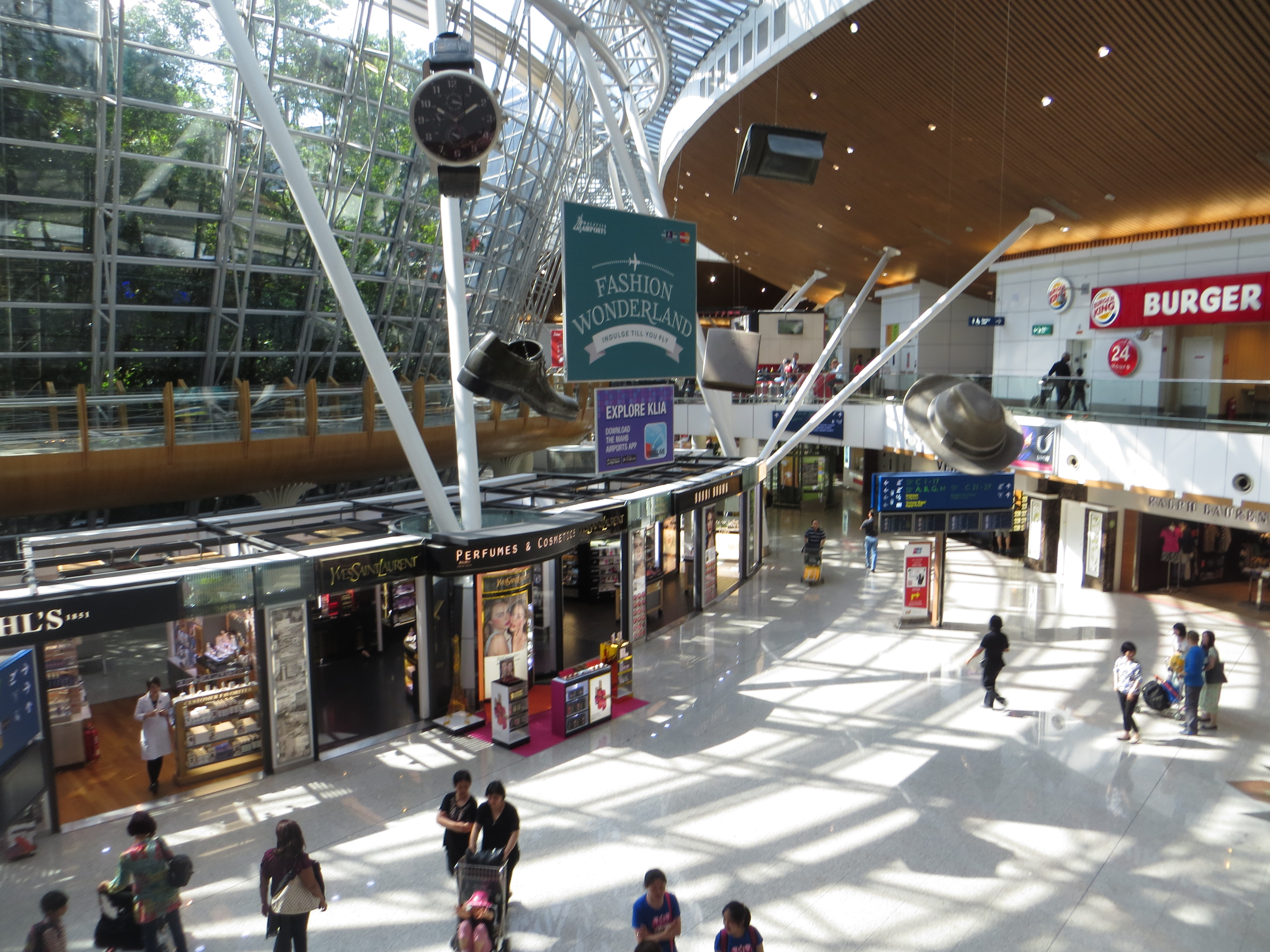
Interior of the Satellite Terminal

Within the terminal, wireless internet (Wi-Fi) is provided free of charge. The terminal also has prayer rooms, showers and massage service. Various lounge areas are provided, some including children's play areas and movie lounge, broadcasting movie and sport channels. The terminal also features a natural rainforest in the middle of the terminal, exhibiting the Malaysian rainforests.

Under Malaysia Airports Berhad retail optimisation plan, the retail space in satellite terminal A will be further optimised to increase its revenue derived from commercial space rental and a percentage of sale receipts to 50% by year 2010 which currently stands at 35%. Some notable improvements that will be seen after the refurbishments will be the Jungle Boardwalk which will be the first of its kind in the world and larger mezzanine floor to accommodate F&B outlets and viewing galleries.

The gates in Satellite Terminal A have the prefix C. The Satellite A terminal has 27 boarding gates altogether.

=== KL City Air Terminal ===
KL City Air Terminal, sometimes known as Kuala Lumpur City Air Terminal or KL CAT, located at KL Sentral railway station, is a virtual extension of Kuala Lumpur International Airport where city check-in services are provided. KL City Air Terminal is recognised by the International Air Transport Association (IATA) and carries the IATA designation XKL. Currently there are only two airlines providing city check-in services: Malaysia Airlines and Batik Air Malaysia.

=== KLIA Terminal 2 ===
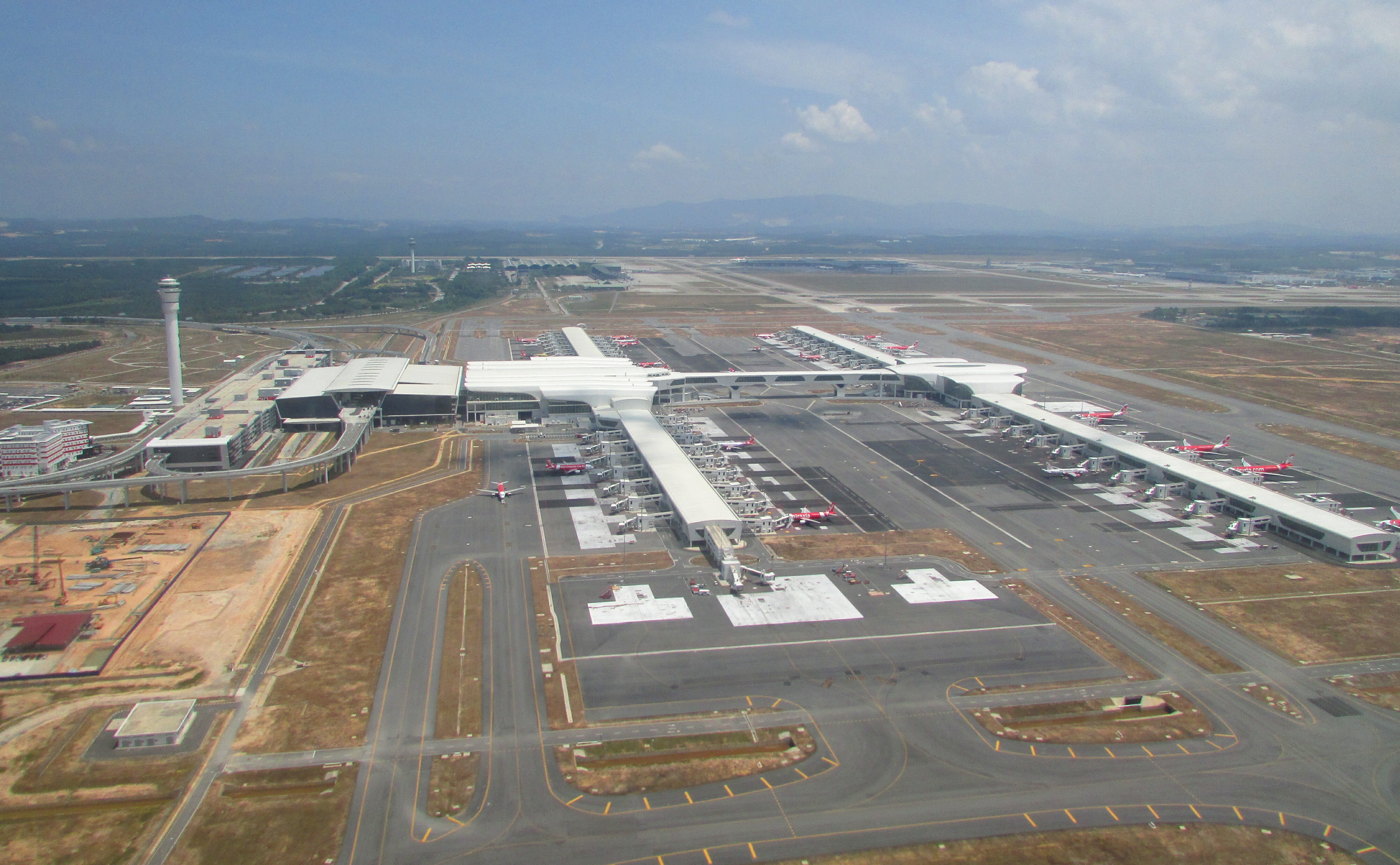
Terminal 2

The KLIA Terminal 2 (formerly known as KLIA2) is the largest purpose-built terminal optimised for low-cost carriers, like AirAsia in response to the exponential growth of low-cost travel in the region. It was built at a cost of approximately RM4 billion to replace the previous Low Cost Carrier Terminal (LCCT). KLIA T2 began its operations on 2 May 2014, and all flight operations at LCCT were moved to KLIA T2 by 9 May 2014.

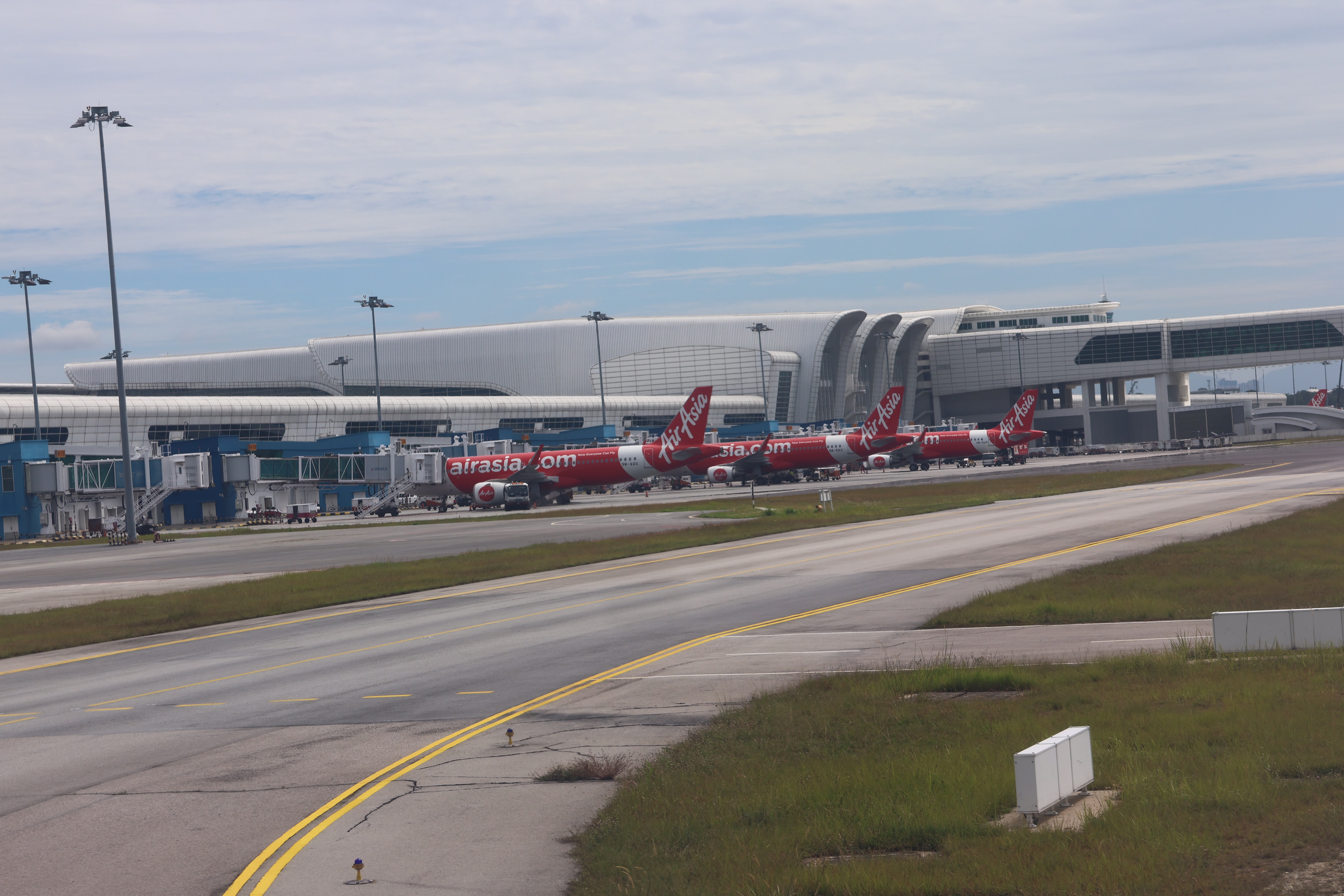
Aircraft at Terminal 2

As part of its development, a third runway (Runway 15/33) and a new air traffic control tower (Tower West) were built to support its operation. KLIA T2 has an initial capacity of 45 million passengers per year. The terminal has a built-up area of 257,845 sqm with 68 departure gates, 10 remote stands, 80 aerobridges, includes a retail space of 32,000 sqm to accommodate a total of 220 retail outlets. The main terminal building of KLIA T2 is connected with its satellite piers with a skybridge, making it the first airport in Asia with such facility. KLIA T2 is certified with Leadership in Energy & Environmental Design (LEED).

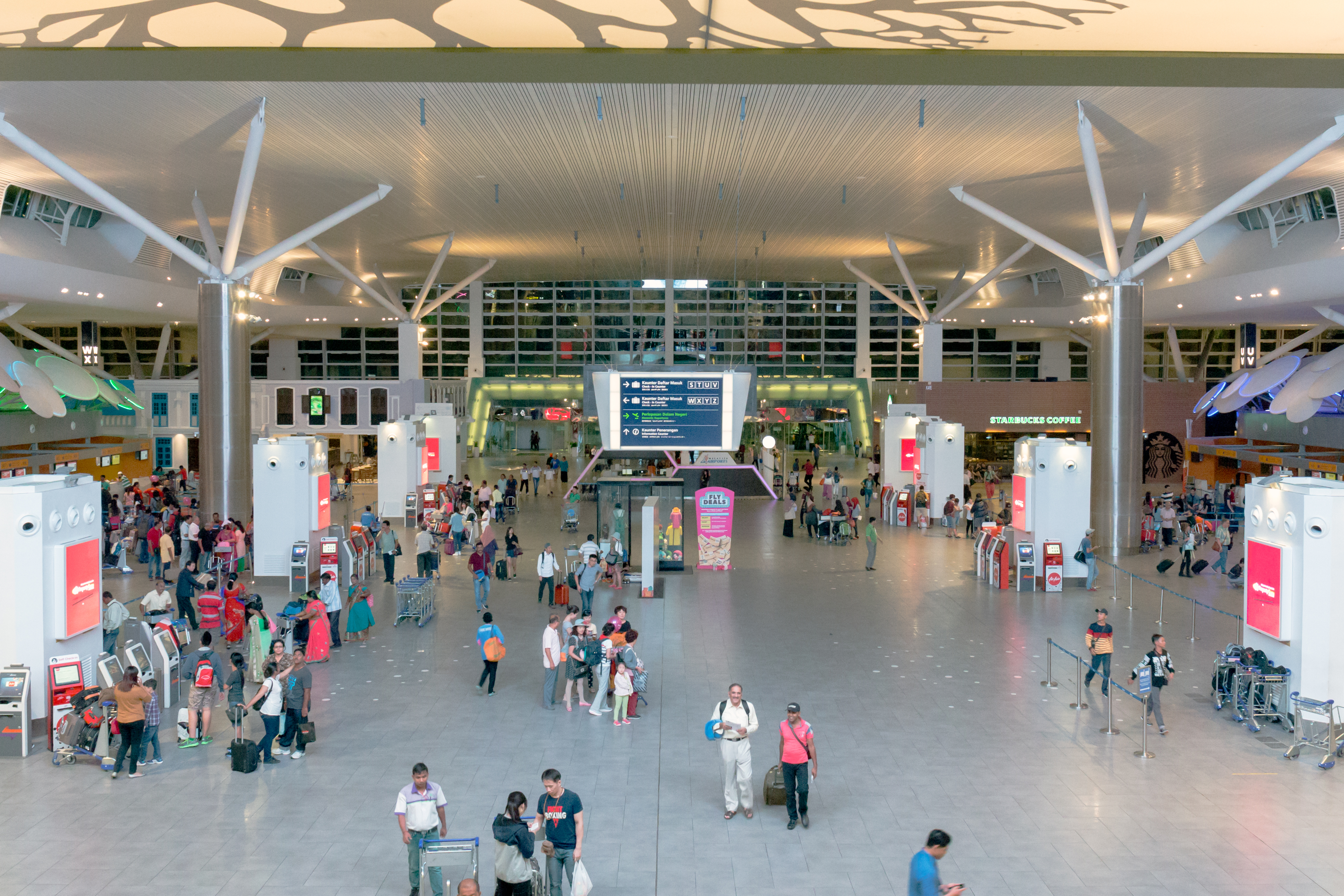
Terminal 2 main lobby with self check-in kiosks

Check-in counters are divided into 8 rows located in 4 islands, each row identified by the letters S – Z. Boarding gates are located in 5 piers, indicated by the letters J and K for domestic flights, and L, P and Q for international flights. Piers J, K and L are connected directly to the main terminal building, while Piers P and Q are accessible via the skybridge. Piers K and L are physically the same pier and share the same gates, but with waiting lounges on different levels (Level 1A for K and Level 2 for L). For international flights, the access door from Pier K is sealed off, while for domestic flights, the access door from Pier L is sealed off instead.

At present, inter-terminal connection is provided on the landside at Gateway@klia2 complex and there are provisions for future airside inter-terminal connection.

==== Gateway@klia2 ====
Gateway@klia2 is an integrated shopping complex that is connected to the main KLIA T2 terminal building. It has a 350,000 square feet of net lettable space spanning over four levels. The transport hub at Gateway@klia2 links klia2 to the KLIA Ekspres and KLIA Transit service, with allotted pick-up and drop-off areas for coaches, taxis, rented vehicles and private transportation.

Gateway@klia2 hosts an 8-storey car park that directly adjoins KLIA T2. There are 6,000 covered parking lots at Blocks A and B and another 5,500 lots at car park D. Shuttle buses are available to take the public from the car park D to the terminal. The first capsule transit hotel in Asia, the Capsule by Container Hotel, is also located at Gateway@klia2. Gateway@klia2 is managed by WCT Holdings Berhad.

=== Inter-terminal connectivity ===
Plans are in progress to create a seamless airside connection between KLIA Terminals 1 and 2 to improve the experience of passengers transferring between the two facilities. The proposal aims to eliminate the need for transit passengers to exit one terminal and re-enter the other, despite the existence of limited airside links. Supported by Malaysia Aviation Group, AirAsia and Batik Air, the initiative focuses on operational integration rather than major structural works. Measures being studied include the use of existing airside buses, which currently operate between the Main Terminal and the Satellite Terminal at KLIA Terminal 1, to transport passengers between terminals. Implementation requires coordination on baggage transfer, security screening and Immigration and Customs processes to ensure smooth movement of passengers. The expected timeline for completion is between six and nine months, subject to further operational adjustments.

=== Former Low Cost Carrier Terminal (LCCT) ===
The now defunct 36,000 square metres (390,000 sq ft) low cost carrier terminal (LCCT) was opened at Kuala Lumpur International Airport on 23 March 2006 to cater for the growing number of users of low-cost airlines, especially the passengers of Malaysia's "no-frills" airline AirAsia. The terminal was designed and built in accordance to the low cost carrier business model, with limited terminal amenities. As requested by the low-cost airlines, the terminal did not provide aerobridges, nor were there transfer facilities, rail connections, and the other facilities provided in a fully fledged terminal. LCCT was located within the Air Support Zone; it ceased operations on 9 May 2014, and all low-cost carrier flights subsequently operated out of KLIA T2.

=== Future expansion plans ===
Malaysia Airports Holdings Berhad (MAHB) has announced plans to expand the Kuala Lumpur International Airport to accommodate the increasing number of air travelers. Transport Minister, Anthony Loke Siew Fook stated that the proposal includes increasing the capacity of KLIA Terminal 1 from 30 million passengers per annum (mppa) to 59 mppa and KLIA Terminal 2 from 45 mppa to 67 mppa. The expansion plan also considers constructing a fourth runway and a new Terminal 3.

In addition to the long-term plans, short-term measures have been introduced to improve the passenger experience, such as the installation of self-check-in kiosks and the addition of 20 new immigration autogates. Furthermore, MAHB plans to build a Private Premium Terminal designed for passengers seeking premium services, offering expedited immigration and customs processes and accommodating up to 100 users at a time. This project is currently in the planning stage and is expected to begin in 2025.

MAHB also aims to establish a Hajj and Umrah Terminal with a capacity of five mppa, specifically catering to Muslim pilgrims traveling to Saudi Arabia. This terminal would enable Saudi Arabia's immigration pre-clearance procedures to be conducted at KLIA, reducing waiting times at King Abdulaziz International Airport in Jeddah. However, this development is contingent on approval from the Saudi Arabian government.

== Other buildings ==
Malaysia Airlines has its head office in the Southern Support Zone. The head office moved there in December 2015.

The Air Asia head office is located on the airport property. AirAsia planned to move its head office to a new 613,383 square feet (56,985.1 m^{2}), RM140mil facility constructed at klia2. Until the new head office opened, the airline's head office remained at LCCT. The new klia2 head office was scheduled to open in the end of 2015. It is scheduled to hold about 2,000 AirAsia and AirAsia X employees. Aireen Omar, the AirAsia Country CEO of Malaysia, stated that the headquarters needed to be redesigned because in the klia2 plans the location of the control tower had been changed. Construction on the facility was scheduled to begin in July 2014. Malaysia Airports Holdings is leasing the land that will be occupied by the headquarters. A Philippines AirAsia X flight attendant, January Ann Baysa gave the building the name "RedQuarters" or "RedQ", and its groundbreaking ceremony was held in November 2014. The project was completed and opened on 7 November 2016.

MASkargo has its head office at 1M, Zone C in the Advanced Cargo Centre in the KLIA Free Commercial Zone in the Southern Support Zone. Malaysia Airports has its head office in the Malaysia Airports Corporate Office in the Persiaran Korporat KLIA. Malaysia Airlines operates its Flight Management Building at KLIA. It includes the head office of MAS Golden Boutiques Sdn. Bhd.

== Airlines and destinations ==
=== Passenger ===
Airlines	Destinations
9 Air	Guangzhou, Guiyang
Aero Dili	Dili
Air Algérie	Algiers
Air Arabia	Sharjah
Air Changan	Charter: Yichang
Air China	Beijing–Capital, Chengdu–Tianfu
Air India	Delhi–Indira Gandhi
Air Macau	Macau
Air Mauritius	Mauritius
AirAsia	Ahmedabad, Alor Setar, Amritsar, Balikpapan, Banda Aceh, Bandar Seri Begawan, Bangkok–Don Mueang, Banjarmasin, Batam, Bengaluru, Bintulu, Cebu, Changsha, Chennai, Chiang Mai, Colombo–Bandaranaike, Da Lat, Da Nang, Denpasar, Dhaka, Guangzhou, Guilin, Hanoi, Ho Chi Minh City, Hong Kong, Hyderabad, Jakarta-Soekarno–Hatta, Jieyang, Johor Bahru, Kaohsiung, Kochi, Kolkata, Kota Bharu, Kota Kinabalu, Krabi, Kuala Terengganu, Kuching, Kunming, Labuan, Labuan Bajo, Langkawi, Lombok, Macau, Makassar, Malé, Manila, Medan, Miri, Nanning, Nha Trang, Osaka–Kansai, Padang, Palembang, Pekanbaru, Penang, Perth, Phu Quoc, Phuket, Pontianak, Sandakan, Semarang, Seoul–Incheon, Shenzhen, Sibu, Sihanoukville, Singapore, Tawau, Thiruvananthapuram, Tiruchirappali, Vientiane, Wuhan, Yogyakarta
AirAsia Cambodia	Phnom Penh, Siem Reap
AirAsia X	Almaty, Beijing–Daxing, Chengdu–Tianfu, Denpasar, Hangzhou, Istanbul–Sabiha Gökçen, Karachi, Melbourne, Osaka–Kansai, Shanghai–Pudong, Taipei–Taoyuan, Tokyo–Haneda, Xi'an; Seasonal: Jeddah, Sapporo–Chitose
AirBorneo	Kuching
All Nippon Airways	Tokyo–Haneda, Tokyo–Narita
Batik Air	Jakarta–Soekarno-Hatta, Medan, Surabaya
Batik Air Malaysia	Bangkok–Don Mueang, Banjarmasin, Batam, Bengaluru, Bintulu, Brisbane, Changsha, Chengdu–Tianfu, Colombo–Bandaranaike, Da Nang, Delhi–Indira Gandhi, Denpasar, Dhaka, Dili, Dubai–International, Guangzhou, Haikou, Hanoi, Hong Kong, Jeddah, Johor Bahru, Karachi, Kathmandu, Kochi, Kota Bharu, Kota Kinabalu, Kuching, Kunming, Lahore, Lombok, Malé, Medan, Melbourne, Miri, Mumbai–Shivaji, Osaka–Kansai, Padang, Pekanbaru, Phuket, Sanya, Seoul–Incheon, Shanghai–Pudong, Sibu, Singapore, Surabaya, Sydney–Kingsford Smith, Taipei–Taoyuan, Tashkent, Tawau, Tiruchirappali, Tokyo–Narita, Xiamen, Zhengzhou; Seasonal charter: Dunhuang, Huangshan
Biman Bangladesh Airlines	Dhaka
British Airways	London–Heathrow, Melbourne (begins 10 January 2027)
Cambodia Airways	Phnom Penh
Cathay Pacific	Hong Kong
Cebu Pacific	Manila
China Airlines	Taipei–Taoyuan
China Eastern Airlines	Beijing–Daxing, Dalian, Hangzhou, Kunming, Lanzhou, Nanjing, Shanghai–Pudong, Wuhan, Taiyuan, Xi'an; Seasonal: Hefei
China Southern Airlines	Changsha, Guangzhou, Shenzhen, Zhengzhou
Citilink	Jakarta–Soekarno-Hatta
Emirates	Dubai–International
Ethiopian Airlines	Addis Ababa, Singapore
Etihad Airways	Abu Dhabi
EVA Air	Taipei–Taoyuan
Firefly	Cebu, Johor Bahru, Kota Bharu, Kota Kinabalu, Krabi, Kuala Terengganu, Kuching, Penang, Sanya, Sibu, Singapore, Tawau; Seasonal: Haikou
FitsAir	Colombo–Bandaranaike
Garuda Indonesia	Jakarta–Soekarno-Hatta
Greater Bay Airlines	Seasonal: Hong Kong
Gulf Air	Bahrain, Singapore
Hainan Airlines	Chongqing, Haikou, Qionghai
Himalaya Airlines	Kathmandu
IndiGo	Bengaluru, Chennai, Delhi–Indira Gandhi (begins 20 Decmeber 2026)
Indonesia AirAsia	Denpasar, Jakarta–Soekarno-Hatta, Lombok, Medan, Surabaya
Iran Airtour	Tehran–Imam Khomeini
Iraqi Airways	Baghdad
Japan Airlines	Tokyo–Narita
Jiangxi Air	Nanchang
Juneyao Air	Shanghai–Pudong, Wuxi
KLM	Amsterdam, Jakarta–Soekarno-Hatta
Korean Air	Seoul–Incheon
Lion Air	Lombok, Padang, Pekanbaru
Lufthansa	Frankfurt
Malaysia Airlines	Adelaide, Ahmedabad, Alor Setar, Amritsar, Auckland, Balikpapan, Bangkok–Suvarnabhumi, Beijing–Daxing, Bengaluru, Bintulu, Brisbane, Busan (resumes 2 December 2026), Changsha, Chengdu–Tianfu, Chennai, Chiang Mai, Colombo–Bandaranaike, Da Nang, Delhi–Indira Gandhi, Denpasar, Dhaka, Doha, Fukuoka, Guangzhou, Hanoi, Ho Chi Minh City, Hong Kong, Hyderabad, Jakarta–Soekarno-Hatta, Jeddah, Johor Bahru, Kathmandu, Kochi, Kolkata, Kota Bharu, Kota Kinabalu, Kuala Terengganu, Kuantan, Kuching, Labuan, Langkawi, London–Heathrow, Makassar, Malé, Manila Medan, Medina, Melbourne, Miri, Mumbai–Shivaji, Osaka–Kansai, Paris–Charles de Gaulle, Pekanbaru, Penang, Perth, Phnom Penh, Phuket, Sandakan, Seoul–Incheon, Shanghai–Pudong, Shenzhen, Sibu, Singapore, Surabaya, Sydney–Kingsford Smith, Taipei–Taoyuan, Tawau, Thiruvananthapuram, Tokyo-Narita, Xiamen, Yangon, Yogyakarta–International
Maldivian	Seasonal: Malé
Myanmar Airways International	Yangon
Nepal Airlines	Kathmandu
Oman Air	Muscat
Pakistan International Airlines	Islamabad
Philippine Airlines	Manila
Qatar Airways	Doha
Qingdao Airlines	Qingdao
Riyadh Air	Riyadh
Royal Brunei Airlines	Bandar Seri Begawan
Saudia	Jeddah, Medina, Riyadh
Scoot	Singapore
Shandong Airlines	Jinan, Xiamen (begins 8 January 2027)
Shanghai Airlines	Changchun, Fuzhou, Shanghai–Pudong
Shenzhen Airlines	Shenzhen
Sichuan Airlines	Chengdu–Tianfu, Chongqing
Singapore Airlines	Singapore
Spring Airlines	Guangzhou, Shanghai–Pudong
SriLankan Airlines	Colombo–Bandaranaike
Starlux Airlines	Taipei–Taoyuan
Sun PhuQuoc Airways	Phu Quoc
Super Air Jet	Banda Aceh
Thai AirAsia	Bangkok–Don Mueang, Hat Yai
Thai Airways International	Bangkok–Suvarnabhumi
Thai VietJet Air	Bangkok–Suvarnabhumi
TransNusa	Bandar Lampung, Denpasar (begins 10 December 2026), Jakarta–Soekarno-Hatta
Turkish Airlines	Istanbul
Turkmenistan Airlines	Ashgabat
US-Bangla Airlines	Dhaka
Uzbekistan Airways	Tashkent
VietJet Air	Da Nang, Hanoi, Ho Chi Minh City
Vietnam Airlines	Hanoi, Ho Chi Minh City
XiamenAir	Chongqing, Fuzhou, Hangzhou, Nanjing, Quanzhou, Xiamen; Seasonal: Changsha
Zipair Tokyo	Tokyo–Narita

=== Cargo ===
Airlines	Destinations
Cargolux	Zhengzhou
JD Airlines	Shenzhen
MASkargo	Adelaide, Amsterdam, Bangkok–Suvarnabhumi, Chongqing, Delhi–Indira Gandhi, Guangzhou, Labuan, Tokyo–Narita
Raya Airways	Jakarta–Soekarno-Hatta
Teleport operated by AirAsia	Kuching
UPS Airlines	Penang

== Statistics ==
Busiest international routes (2023)
Rank	Airport	Passengers	% change 2022/23
1	Singapore	3,601,340	▲52.0
2	Jakarta–Soekarno–Hatta	1,892,344	▲113.0
3	Denpasar	1,370,621	▲140.7
4	Bangkok–Don Mueang	1,310,132	▲161.6
5	Taipei–Taoyuan	987,063	▲610.5
6	Bangkok–Suvarnabhumi	965,131	▲82.3
7	Ho Chi Minh City	861,760	▲102.2
8	Dhaka	859,679	▲52.5
9	Jeddah	771,174	▲38.9
10	Medan	769,006	▲146.1
11	Dubai–International	726,389	▲161.0
12	Hong Kong	704,699	▲575.1
13	Phuket	702,317	▲179.3
14	Manila	690,335	▲94.2
15	Seoul–Incheon	638,026	▲182.6
16	Guangzhou	622,384	▲1,583.3
17	Surabaya	609,261	▲156.2
18	Doha	606,041	▲31.4
19	Chennai	573,338	▲76.2
20	Perth	561,975	▲250.5
21	Sydney	545,376	▲142.1
22	Melbourne	534,425	▲117.9
23	Tokyo–Narita	482,519	▲115.6
24	Kathmandu	448,823	▲23.8
25	Delhi	424,349	▲119.7

Busiest domestic routes (2022)
Rank	Airport	Passengers	% change 2021/22
1	Kota Kinabalu, Sabah	2,171,604	▲306.6
2	Kuching, Sarawak	1,756,964	▲489.2
3	Langkawi, Kedah	1,471,511	▲185.9
4	Penang, Penang	1,044,895	▲480.0
5	Kota Bharu, Kelantan	784,586	▲206.9
6	Tawau, Sabah	750,998	▲261.5
7	Miri, Sarawak	528,918	▲503.9
8	Sibu, Sarawak	493,929	▲594.4
9	Kuala Terengganu, Terengganu	415,291	▲343.0
10	Johor Bahru, Johor	337,289	▲439.6

Operational statistics of Kuala Lumpur International Airport
Year	Passengers handled	Passenger % change	Cargo (tonnes)	Cargo % change	Aircraft movements	Aircraft % change
1998	6,524,405	Steady	156,641	Steady	64,123	Steady
1999	13,172,635	▲101.9	417,068	▲166.3	116,589	▲81.8
2000	14,732,876	▲11.8	510,594	▲22.4	109,925	▼5.7
2001	14,538,831	▼1.3	440,864	▼13.6	113,590	▲3.3
2002	16,398,230	▲12.8	527,124	▲19.6	127,952	▲12.6
2003	17,454,564	▲6.4	586,195	▲11.2	139,947	▲9.4
2004	21,058,572	▲20.6	651,747	▲11.2	165,115	▲18.0
2005	23,213,926	▲10.2	653,654	▲0.3	182,537	▲10.5
2006	24,129,748	▲4.0	672,888	▲3.0	183,869	▲0.7
2007	26,453,379	▲9.6	644,100	▼4.3	193,710	▲5.3
2008	27,529,355	▲4.1	649,077	▲0.8	211,228	▲9.0
2009	29,682,093	▲7.8	584,559	▼10.0	226,751	▲7.3
2010	34,087,636	▲14.8	674,902	▲15.4	245,650	▲8.3
2011	37,704,510	▲10.6	669,849	▼0.7	269,509	▲9.7
2012	39,887,866	▲5.8	673,107	▲0.5	283,352	▲5.1
2013	47,498,157	▲19.1	680,982	▲1.2	326,678	▲15.3
2014	48,930,409	▲3.0	753,899	▲10.7	340,821	▲4.3
2015	48,938,424	0.0	726,230	▼3.7	354,519	▲4.0
2016	52,643,511	▲7.6	642,558	▼11.5	356,614	▲0.6
2017	58,554,627	▲11.2	710,186	▲10.5	387,234	▲8.6
2018	59,988,409	▲2.4	714,669	▲0.6	399,827	▲3.3
2019	62,336,469	▲3.9	687,240	▼3.8	407,315	▲2.1
2020	13,156,363	▼78.9	505,183	▼26.5	124,529	▼69.4
2021	4,011,836	▼69.5	660,039	▲30.7	73,673	▼40.8
2022	25,399,296	▲533.1	684,459	▲3.7	198,302	▲169.2
2023	47,224,000	▲85.9	660,040	▼3.6	319,026	▲60.9
2024	57,008,869	▲17.29%	794,943	▲17.29	364,939	▲14.4

Total passenger movements by countries (2018)
Rank	Country	Passengers movement	% change 2017 / 18
1	Indonesia	7,792,194	▲6.2
2	China	4,703,041	▲8.4
3	Thailand	4,212,887	▼1.3
4	Singapore	4,097,000	▲0.3
5	India	3,250,736	▲7.7
6	Australia	2,343,155	▼8.7
7	Vietnam	1,983,727	▲8.7
8	Hong Kong	1,580,320	▼0.3
9	Japan	1,503,733	▲1.0
10	South Korea	1,302,689	▲32.2

Largest airlines by passengers (2018)
Rank	Airlines	Passengers carried	% market share
1	AirAsia	22,749,737	37.9
2	Malaysia Airlines	13,403,931	22.3
3	AirAsia X	5,643,538	9.4
4	Malindo Air	4,438,320	7.4
5	Indonesia AirAsia	1,269,368	2.1
6	Emirates	861,235	1.4
7	Cathay Dragon	722,029	1.2
8	Saudia	565,768	0.9
9	SilkAir	565,158	0.9
10	Lion Air	534,406	0.9

Busiest international freight routes (2018)
Rank	Airport	Freight (tonnes)	% change 2017 / 18
1	Hong Kong	50,378	▼11.3
2	Taipei–Taoyuan	34,800	▲11.7
3	Seoul–Incheon	31,708	▲0.5
4	Shanghai–Pudong	30,394	▼16.4
5	Singapore	29,711	▼2.6
6	Tokyo–Narita	28,584	▲9.2
7	Doha	24,177	▼5.9
8	Melbourne	23,818	▲3.8
9	Sydney	22,464	▲3.0
10	Bangkok–Suvarnabhumi	19,960	▲15.9

== Ground transportation ==
=== Inter-terminal transportation ===
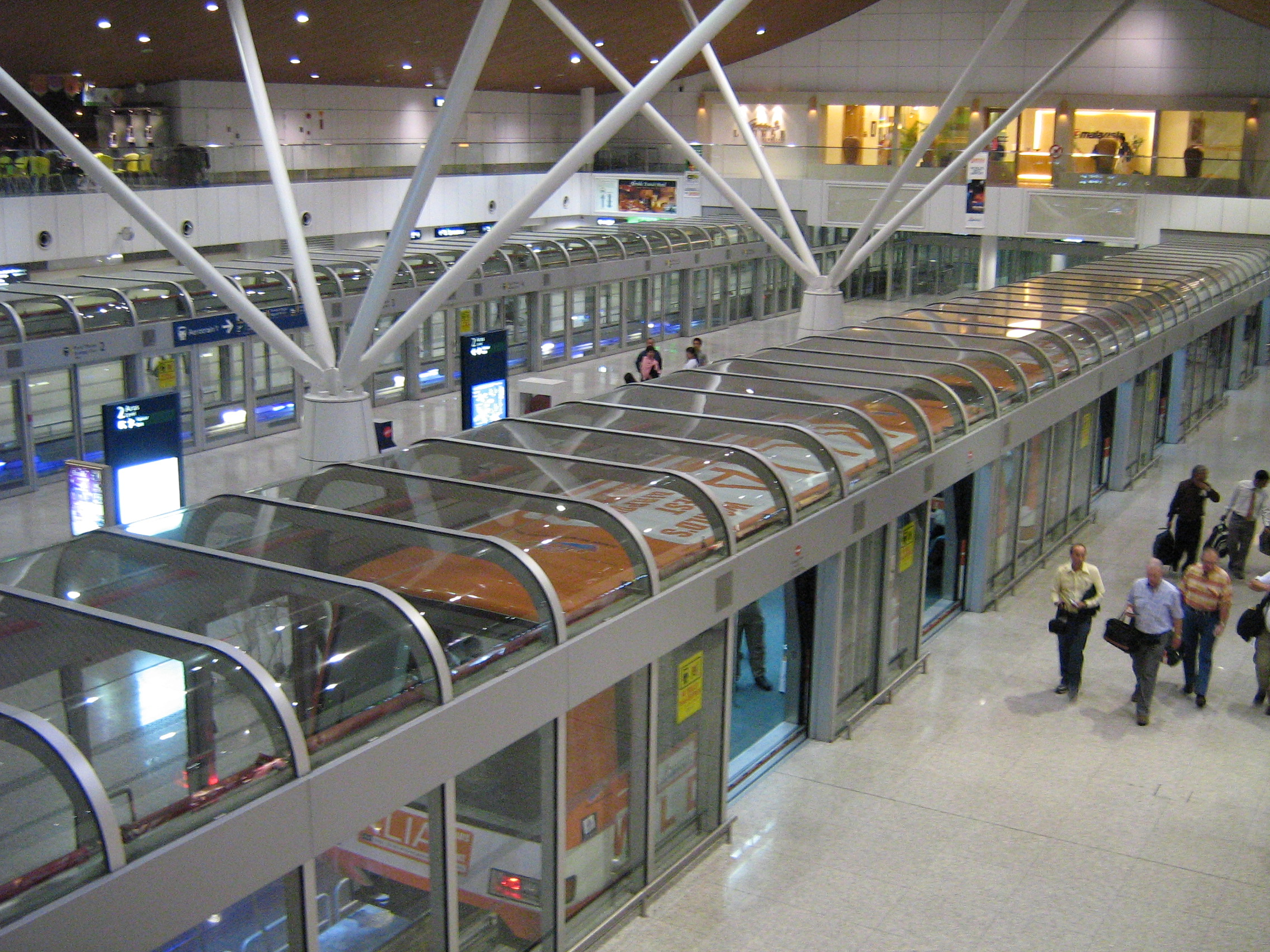
Aerotrain station in Satellite Building

The Aerotrain is an automated people mover (APM) that connects the airside of KLIA Main Terminal Building (MTB) and the Satellite Building. In its original configuration, each 250-person capacity train can transport 3,000 passengers per hour in each direction at up to 56 km/h (35 mph). These three-car driverless trains run on elevated rail and under the taxiways. The Aerotrain operates between three and five-minute intervals between terminal, and the journey takes under two minutes. Automatic train controls manage the operation of the entire Aerotrain system, controlling the speeds, headways, stops and door openings in stations, and integrating functions that enhance the reliability and performance of the system.

The AeroTrain had been out of service for repairs and replacement work, including new rolling stock, between March 2023 and 1 July 2025.

Although there are some proposal of the airside connection between the two terminals, It was still unmaterialized as the connecting passengers must clear Malaysian immigration and customs checks before taking a landside transportation option (Express Rail Link, bus or taxi) to get from one terminal to the other.

=== External connections ===
==== Rail ====
Kuala Lumpur International Airport is linked to the KL Sentral transportation hub in the city centre by the 57 km (35 mi) long Express Rail Link (ERL). There are two ERL stations at the airport: KLIA T1 ERL station at the Main Terminal Building and KLIA T2 ERL station at Gateway@klia2.

==== Bus ====
Kuala Lumpur International Airport has bus terminals in both KLIA and KLIA2 building which serves local buses, city express and intercity express buses to various destination in Kuala Lumpur, Klang Valley and also various parts of Peninsular Malaysia, as well as shuttles between KLIA and KLIA2, terminals to Long Term Car Park and terminals to Mitsui Outlet Park. KLIA bus terminal is located on Ground Floor, Block C and KLIA 2 bus terminal is located on Level 1 of the terminal. Ticketing counters are present in the terminals.

Buses to the Kuala Lumpur city mainly goes to KL Sentral railway station and Integrated Southern Terminal bus terminal (TBS), both a prominent transport hub of Kuala Lumpur, as well as various other places like Pudu Sentral, Jalan Ipoh and Jalan Pekeliling Terminal. There are also buses to parts of other Klang Valley cities like Shah Alam (Section 17 terminal), Klang (AEON Bukit Tinggi) as well as Putra Heights LRT station. Popular providers are Aerobus, Airport Coach and Jetbus.

Intercity services are available to Penang, Ipoh, Yong Peng (central Johor), Johor Bahru, Genting Highlands, Malacca and Sitiawan (Perak). Local buses are also available to Nilai (walking distance to KTM Nilai) which is part of BAS.MY and Banting, with Smart Selangor Bus free shuttle available to Banting, Tanjung Sepat and Salak Tinggi.

==== Car ====
Kuala Lumpur International Airport is mainly served by the toll-free KLIA Expressway (Federal Route 26) which is 11 kilometres (6.8 mi) from KLIA Interchange of ELITE Expressway (E6) to both KLIA and KLIA2. The expressway also has connection to:

- KLIA Outer Ring Road (Federal 27) to KLIA mosque and Sepang International Circuit.
- Labohan Dagang–Nilai Road (Federal 32) to Banting, Nilai and Salak Tinggi.

The further end of the expressway leads to tolled ELITE Expressway, which connects it to the PLUS expressway networks (E1 North-South Expressway-North, E1 New Klang Valley Expressway and E2 North-South Expressway-South) which links to most of Klang Valley's major townships and further to Peninsular Malaysia's west coast states, to the extent of the border with Thailand and Singapore.

== Expansion and developments ==
=== Plans ===
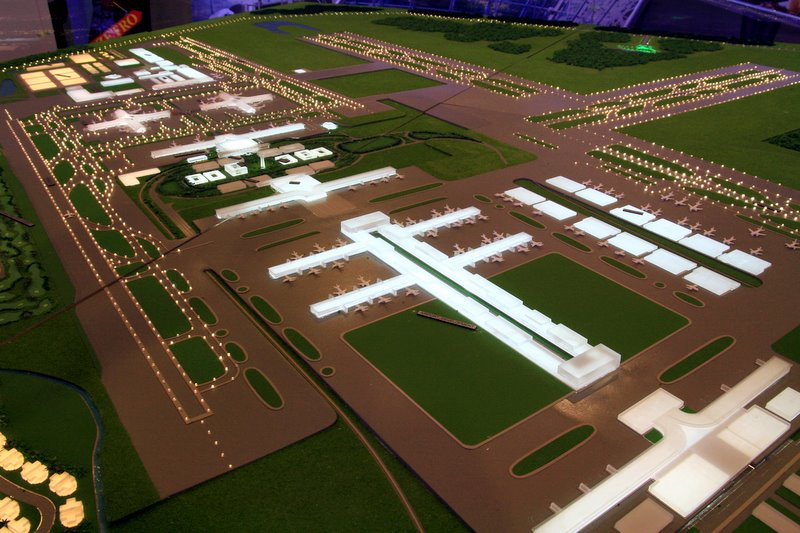
KLIA Aeropolis Masterplan

With the slight modification of the masterplan, the future Terminal 2's satellite terminal will be combined into one satellite terminal. The expansion of Terminal 2's satellite terminal will be exactly the same as Terminal 1's (the current Main Terminal) satellite terminal, where initially the satellite terminal will have four arms, and another four arms when the terminal reached its capacity. There is sufficient land and capacity to develop facilities to handle up to 97.5 million passengers a year, four runways by 2020 and two mega-terminals, each linked with satellite terminals.

On 12 December 2024, Transport Minister, Anthony Loke Siew Fook announced that plans to expand KLIA are in the pipeline to cater for the increasing flight passengers. The proposal includes increasing the capacity of T1 from 30 million passengers per annum to 59 million and T2 from 45 million to 67 million. A fourth runway and a new terminal, T3 are also in consideration.

Summary of Kuala Lumpur International Airport Masterplan
Phase	Year	Description
Phase 1	1998	Initial capacity of 25 million passengers per annum
Phase 1	2006	Capable of handling 35 million passengers per annum with the construction of Low Cost Carrier Terminal
Phase 2	2008	Expansion of Low Cost Carrier Terminal to accommodate 40 million passengers per annum
Phase 3	2011	New Low Cost Carrier Terminal will be constructed to accommodate additional 30 million (55 million) passengers per annum, Current Low Cost Carrier Terminal converted to cargo usage.
Phase 3	Not fixed	Satellite Terminal B will be constructed to handle a maximum of 75 million passengers. (One terminal accompanied by 2 satellite terminal and one low-cost carrier terminal.)
Phase 4	Not fixed	Terminal 2 and Satellite Terminal C will be constructed so that the airport can handle 97.5 million passengers.

=== A380 upgrades ===
The operator of Kuala Lumpur International Airport, Malaysia Airports Holding Berhad, had spent approximately RM135 million to upgrade facilities at the KL International Airport (KLIA) in Sepang to accommodate the Airbus A380. KLIA is the only airport in Malaysia that accommodate the landing and take off of the A380. Upgrading works started on 3 April 2006, and was completed by 28 May 2007. Works include the provision of shoulders on both sides of the two existing runways of 15 meters as well as the taxiways, building additional aerobridges at the three departure halls, namely C17, C27 and C37, and enhancing the mezzanine lounges for upper deck passengers of the aircraft at the departure halls. Emirates is the only current operator of the Airbus A380 to Kuala Lumpur; its services commenced on 1 January 2012. Malaysia Airlines started its A380 services from Kuala Lumpur to London on 1 July 2012 before retiring the aircraft type at the end of 2018.

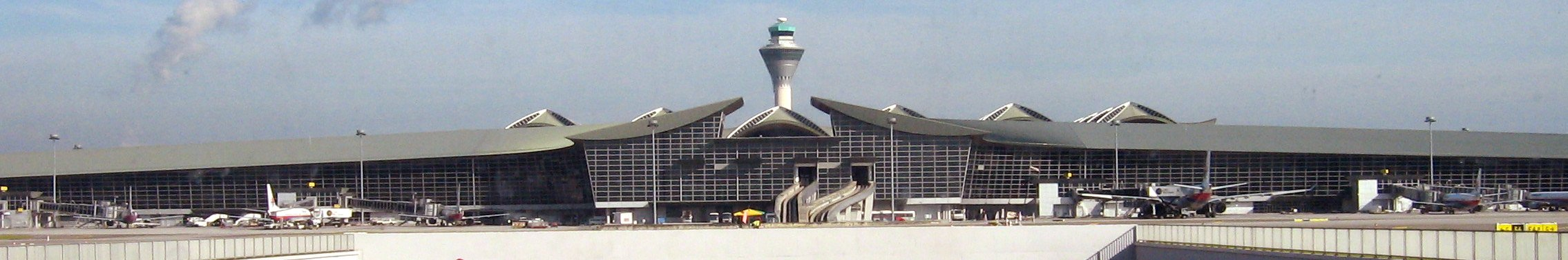
Panoramic view of Main Terminal Building and Contact Pier

== Accidents and incidents ==
- On 8 March 2014, a Boeing 777-2H6ER operating as Malaysian Airlines Flight 370 went missing over the Indian Ocean 40 minutes after take-off from Kuala Lumpur, with 239 on board.
- On 21 December 2016, a Beechcraft B200T Super King Air with the registration M41-03 operating for the Royal Malaysian Air Force crashed while landing at Butterworth Airport, killing one of the four people on board. The aircraft had departed from Kuala Lumpur.
- On 13 February 2017, Kim Jong-nam, the estranged half-brother of North Korean leader Kim Jong Un, was assassinated at KLIA2 using the nerve agent VX.
- On 8 April 2019, a bus carrying foreign workers crashed into a ditch near the MASkargo complex, killing 12 people (the driver and 11 passengers).
- On 14 April 2024, a man detonated fireworks in KLIA and attempted to shoot his wife, but instead shot her bodyguard in the abdomen.
- On 1 May 2026, two separate cases of suicide involving a Chinese woman and an Algerian man happened on the same day as both of them jumped out of the same balcony leading towards the Loading Bay Area at KLIA Terminal 2.
- On 16 May 2026, a major security breach occurred at KLIA Terminal 1 when a Chinese woman managed to bypass an automated security gate at the International Departure zone without a valid boarding pass or flight ticket.
- On 27 August 2026, a body of an unidentified man was discovered inside of a wheel compartment in a flight from Tokyo, Japan to KLIA Terminal 2. According to KLIA District Police Chief, M. Ravi, he stated that the unknown man was estimated to be between 17 to 25 years old and found no identification documents as well as no signs of injury on him. Initial examination results also found that the man was believed to be dead for more than 72 hours prior to his discovery.

== Award and recognition ==
On 22 November 2024, KLIA was named Large Airport of the Year 2024 by the Centre for Aviation (CAPA) for its exceptional connectivity performance in view of the strong regional competition, commitment to the development of major infrastructure, and flexibility in servicing both full-fledged and low-cost airlines.

KLIA's Terminal 2 was voted 2024's best terminal for low-cost airlines in Southeast Asia and 7th overall in the world by Skytrax.

== See also ==
- List of airports with triple takeoff/landing capability
