= Labuan Airport =

Airport in East Malaysia

Labuan International Airport Lapangan Terbang Antarabangsa Labuan
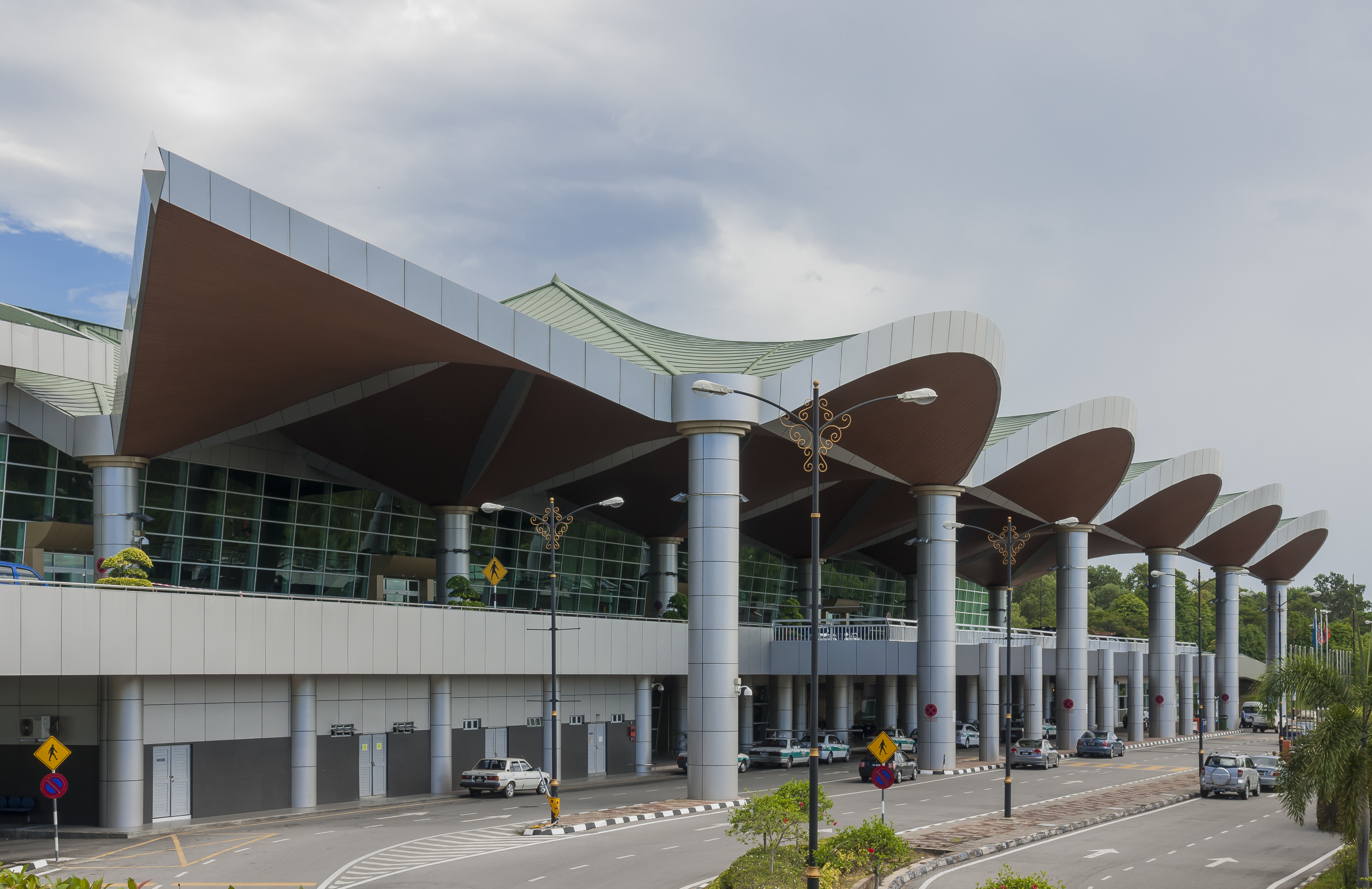
- IATA: LBU; ICAO: WBKL

Summary
- Airport type: Military/public
- Owner: Khazanah Nasional Berhad
- Operator: Malaysia Airports
- Serves: Labuan, Malaysia
- Location: Victoria, Labuan, Malaysia
- Time zone: MST (UTC+08:00)
- Elevation AMSL: 101 ft (31 m)
- Coordinates: 05°18′06″N 115°14′54″E

Map
- Location in Labuan Island, East Malaysia LBU/WBKL (Malaysia) LBU/WBKL (Southeast Asia) LBU/WBKL (Asia)

Runways
Direction	Length		Surface
Direction	m	ft	Surface
14/32	2,745	9,006	Asphalt

Statistics (2020)
- Passenger: 270,959 (▼61.9%)
- Airfreight (tonnes): 3,354 (▼46.5%)
- Aircraft movements: 5,999 (▼50.6%)
- Sources: official web site AIP Malaysia

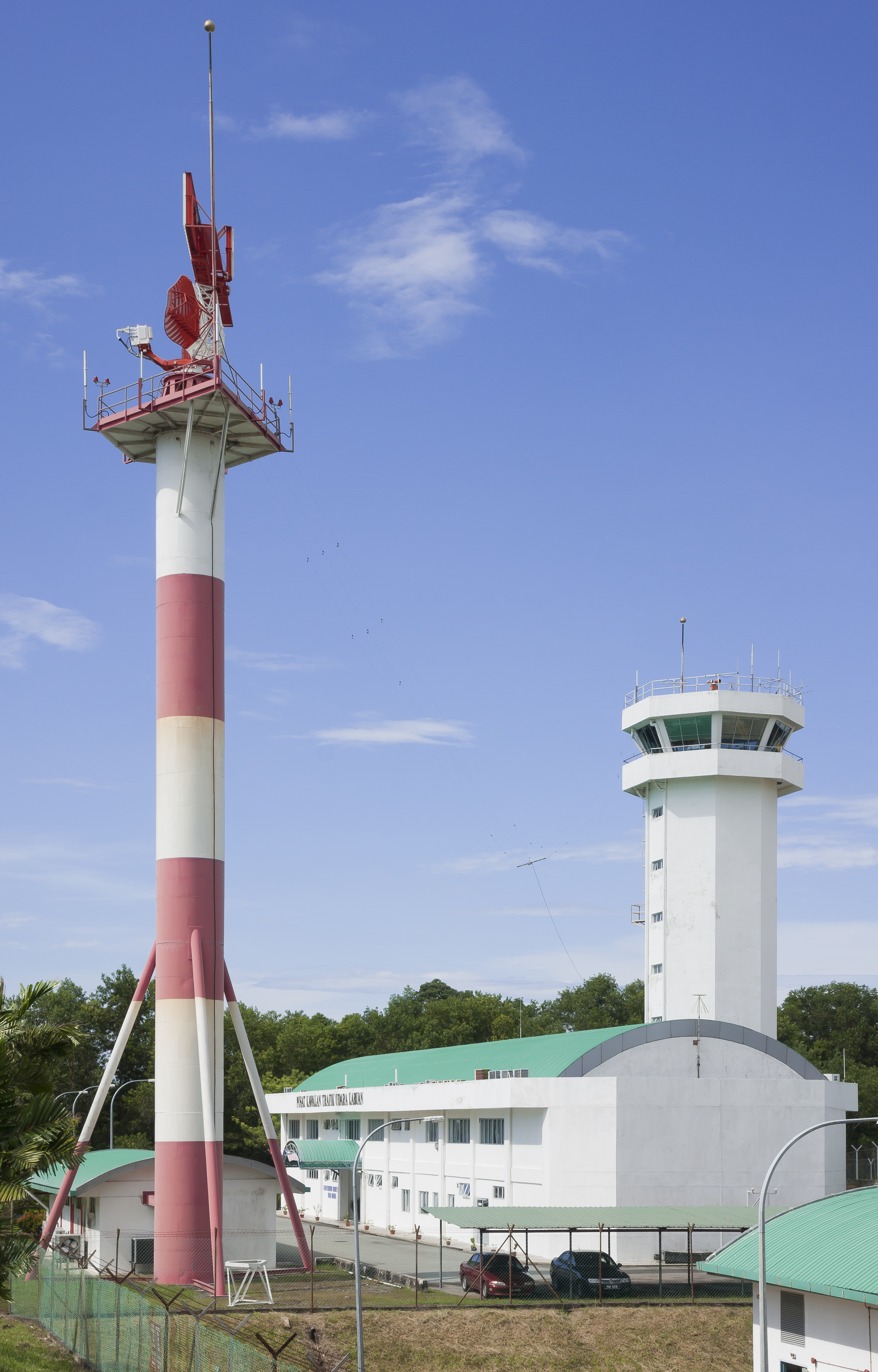
Labuan Airport air traffic control tower

Labuan Airport (IATA: LBU, ICAO: WBKL), formerly known as Timbalai Airfield, is an airport that serves the federal territory of Labuan in Malaysia. The airport is 2.5 km (1.6 mi) or 5 km (3.1 mi) by road from Victoria (Labuan Town). It was planned for Labuan International Airport to be a regional hub for connecting flights within the Association of Southeast Asian Nations (ASEAN) but this plan was postponed due to logistics and unsuitability.

At present, this airport can accommodate larger aircraft such as the Boeing 747 and the Airbus A330, with 4 aerobridges. In 2008, the airport handled 550,859 passengers, 11,328 aircraft movements and over 4,500 metric tonnes of cargo. The airport is able to handle over 1.2 million passengers per year.

== Airlines and destinations ==
=== Passenger ===
Airlines	Destinations
AirAsia	Kuala Lumpur–International
AirBorneo	Kota Kinabalu, Miri
Malaysia Airlines	Kuala Lumpur–International

=== Cargo ===
Airlines	Destinations
MASkargo	Hong Kong, Kota Kinabalu, Kuala Lumpur–International
Raya Airways	Kuala Lumpur–Subang

== Traffic and statistics ==
=== Traffic ===
Annual passenger numbers and aircraft statistics
Year	Passengers handled	Passenger % change	Cargo (tonnes)	Cargo % change	Aircraft movements	Aircraft % change
2011	567,928	Steady	5,294	Steady	12,762	Steady
2012	617,130	▲8.7	6,072	▲14.7	13,589	▲6.5
2013	738,769	▲19.7	9,329	▲53.6	15,139	▲11.4
2014	789,494	▲6.9	11,591	▲24.2	15,596	▲3.0
2015	684,108	▼13.3	9,834	▼15.2	13,249	▼15.0
2016	269,696	▼13.0	4,620	▼53.0	10,959	▼17.3
2017	595,290	▲3.0	5,071	▲9.8	10,185	▼7.1
2018	574,107	▼0.6	3,996	▼21.1	10,698	▲5.0
2019	710,271	▲23.7	6,270	▲56.9	12,143	▲13.5
2020	270,959	▼61.9	3,354	▼46.5	5,999	▼50.6
^{Source: Malaysia Airports Holdings Berhad}

=== Statistics ===
Rank	Destination	Frequency (weekly)
1	Sarawak, Miri	28
2	Sabah, Kota Kinabalu	28
3	Kuala Lumpur	21

== Nearest place ==
The Labuan Airport is connected with RMAF Labuan Air Base, which shares the runway with the airport itself. Other places such as the Labuan Meteorology Office, Labuan Botanical Gardens as well as the Labuan Golf Club, are also located near the airport.

== See also ==
- Indonesia–Malaysia confrontation
- Far East Air Force (Royal Air Force)
- List of former Royal Air Force stations
