= Compassvale =

Place in Sengkang, Singapore

- Subzone of Sengkang Planning Area & Housing Estate

Name transcription(s)
  - Chinese: 康埔桦
  - Pinyin: kāngpǔhuà
  - Malay: Compassvale
  - Tamil: கம்பஸ்வேல்
- Location of Compassvale within Singapore
- Coordinates: 1°23′27.2″N 103°53′51.4″E
- Country: Singapore

Area
  - Total: 1.09 km^{2} (0.42 sq mi)

Population (2026)
  - Total: 21,540
  - Density: 19,800/km^{2} (51,200/sq mi)

Compassvale is a neighbourhood of Sengkang New Town, and is located between Rivervale and Anchorvale. Compassvale encompasses the Sengkang Town Centre.

== History ==
There used to be a few low-rise flats along Punggol Road with a defunct road named Buangkok South Farmway 1 leading into the estate. It was part of a rural centre built by HDB in the late 1970s. These flats were cleared by mid-2000s for further developments in the vicinity.

== Educational institutions ==
Primary schools

- Compassvale Primary School
- North Vista Primary School
- Seng Kang Primary School

Secondary schools

- Compassvale Secondary School
- Seng Kang Secondary School

== Places of worship ==
Buddhist temples

- Pu Ti Buddhist Temple
- Fu Hui Auditorium, also known as Singapore Buddhist Welfare Services

Mosque

- Mawaddah Mosque

Church

- The Church of Jesus Christ of Latter-day Saints

== Shopping amenities ==
- Compass One Shopping Centre

== Public transport ==
Compassvale is well served by many bus services originating from the Sengkang Bus Interchange, Compassvale Bus Interchange and from other parts of the island. Sengkang MRT station and the east loop of the Sengkang LRT line also serves the area, at Compassvale & Ranggung LRT stations. Buangkok MRT station serves residents living at the southern portion of the neighborhood.

Bus services that call at a pair of bus stops located along the TPE-Punggol Road Interchange also serves residents living in the vicinity, at the Sengkang-Punggol boundary.

== Gallery ==
Housing estates

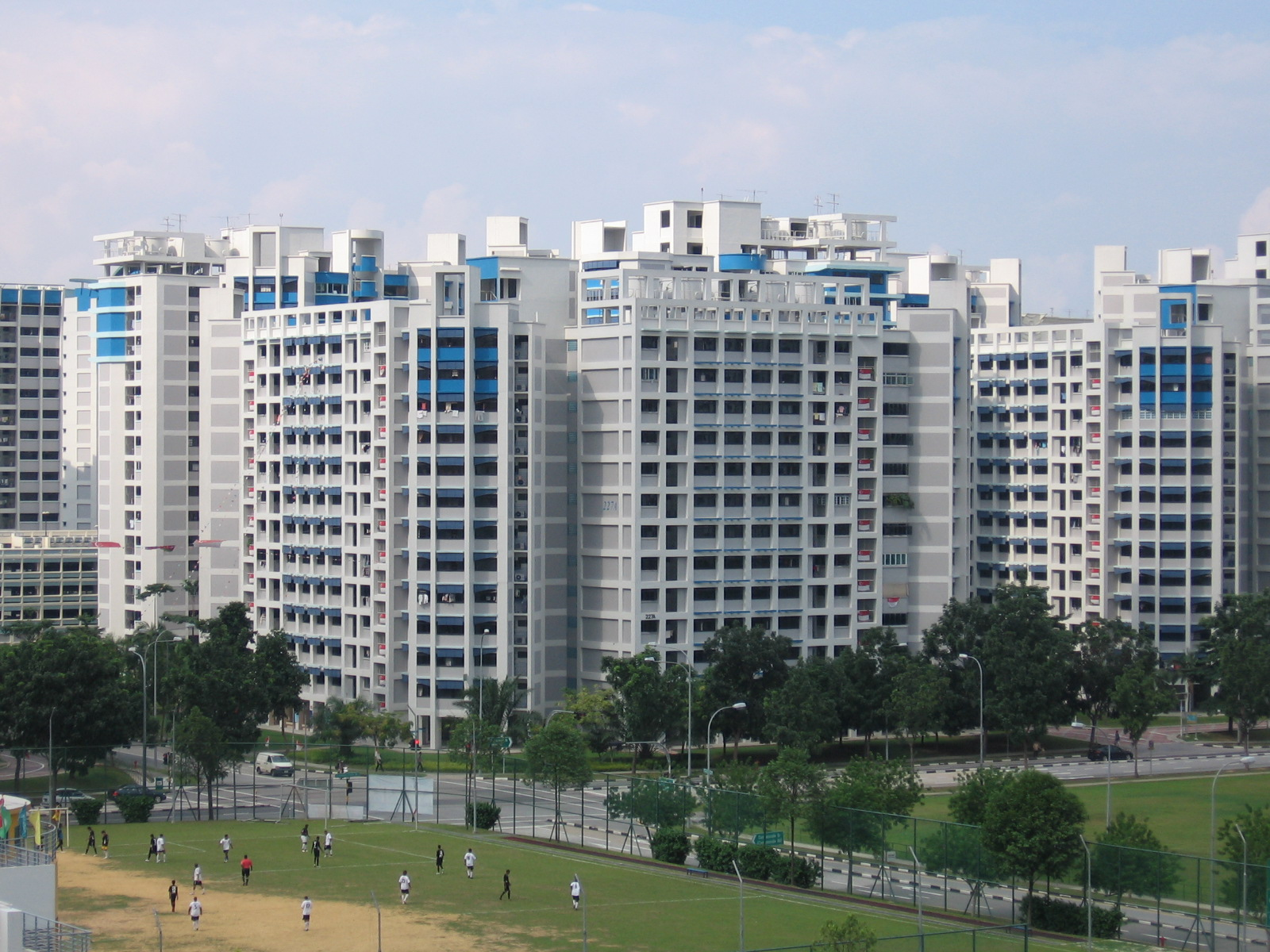
Compassvale Court

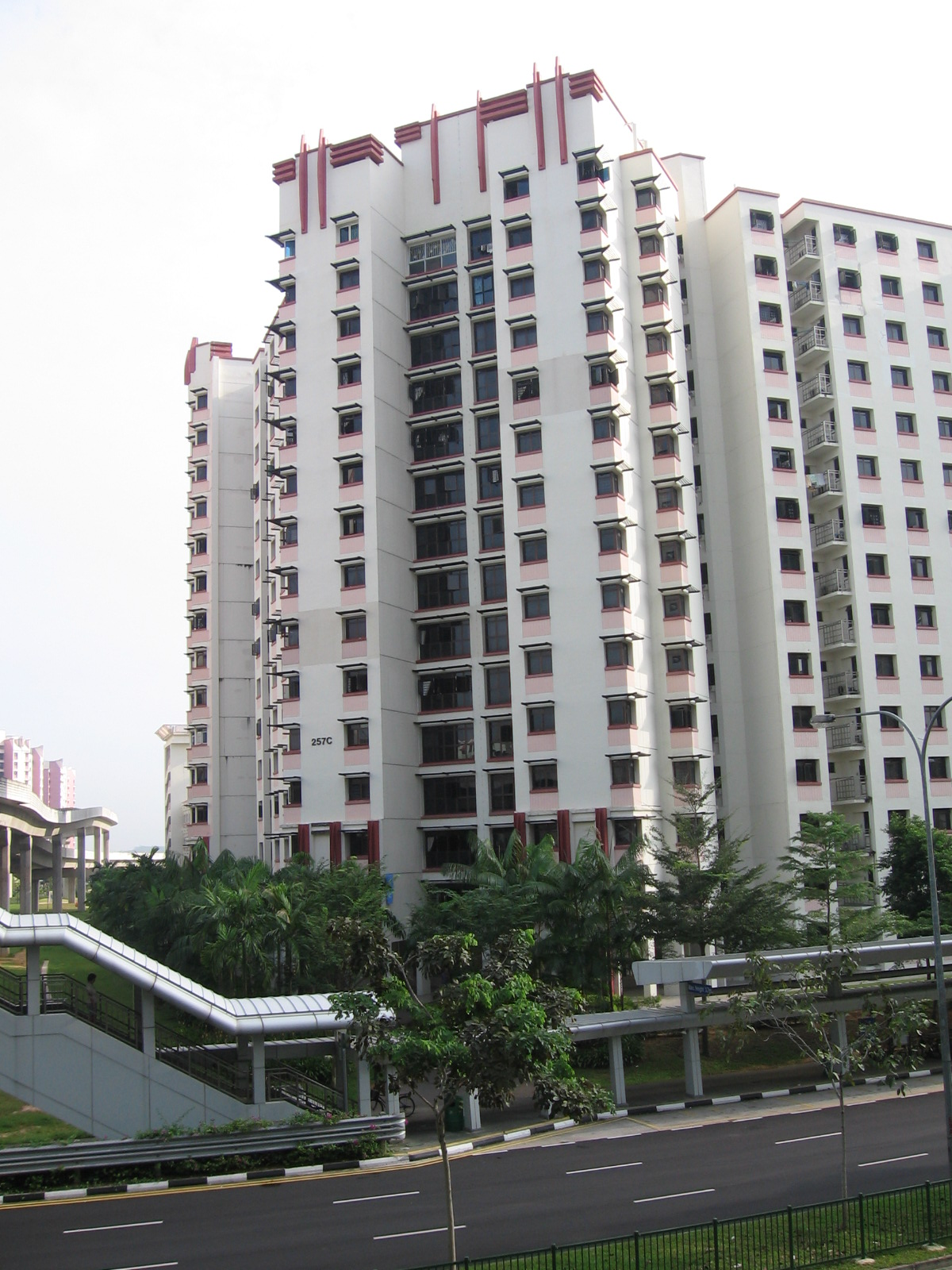
Compassvale Gardens

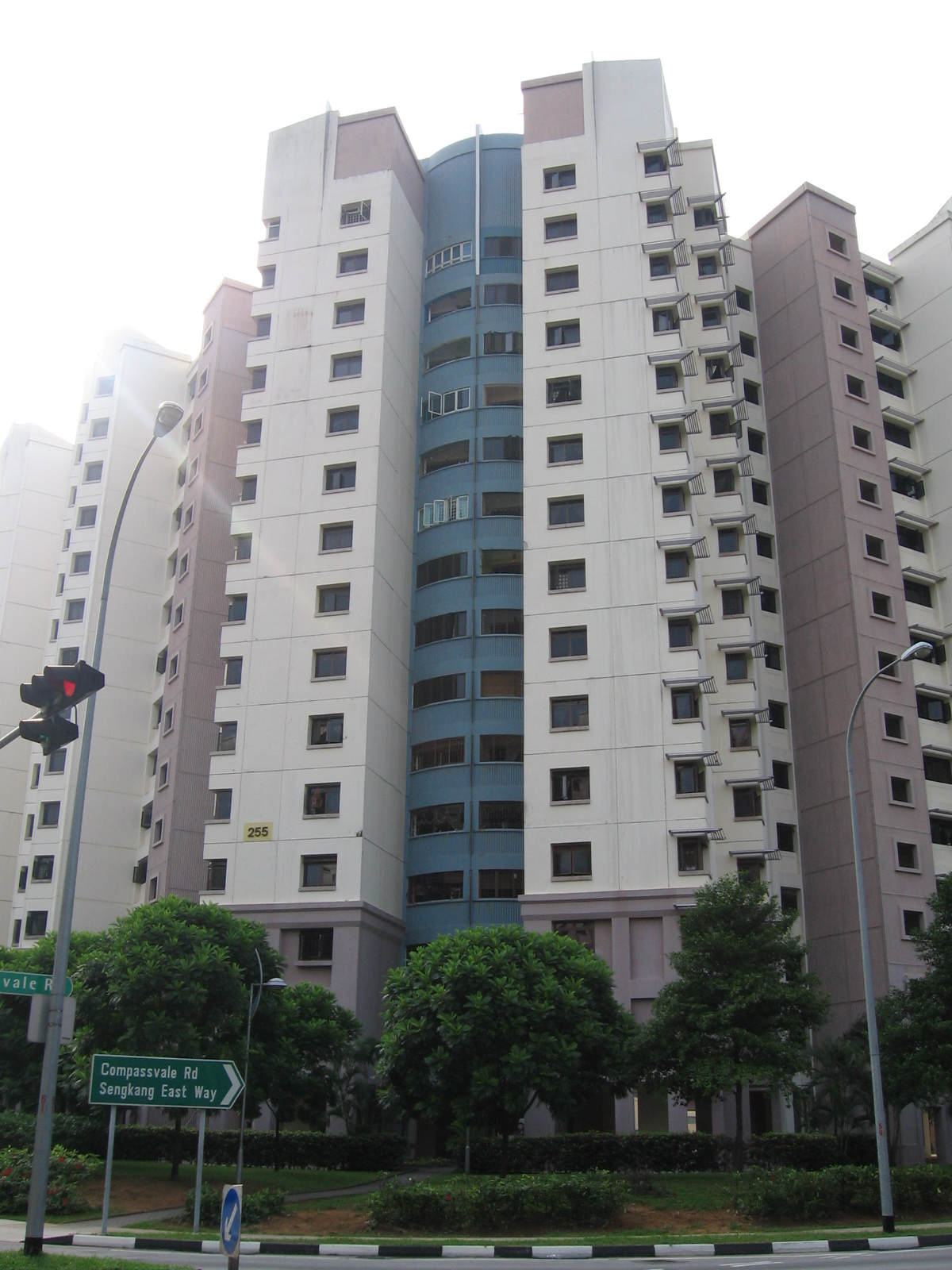
Compassvale Haven

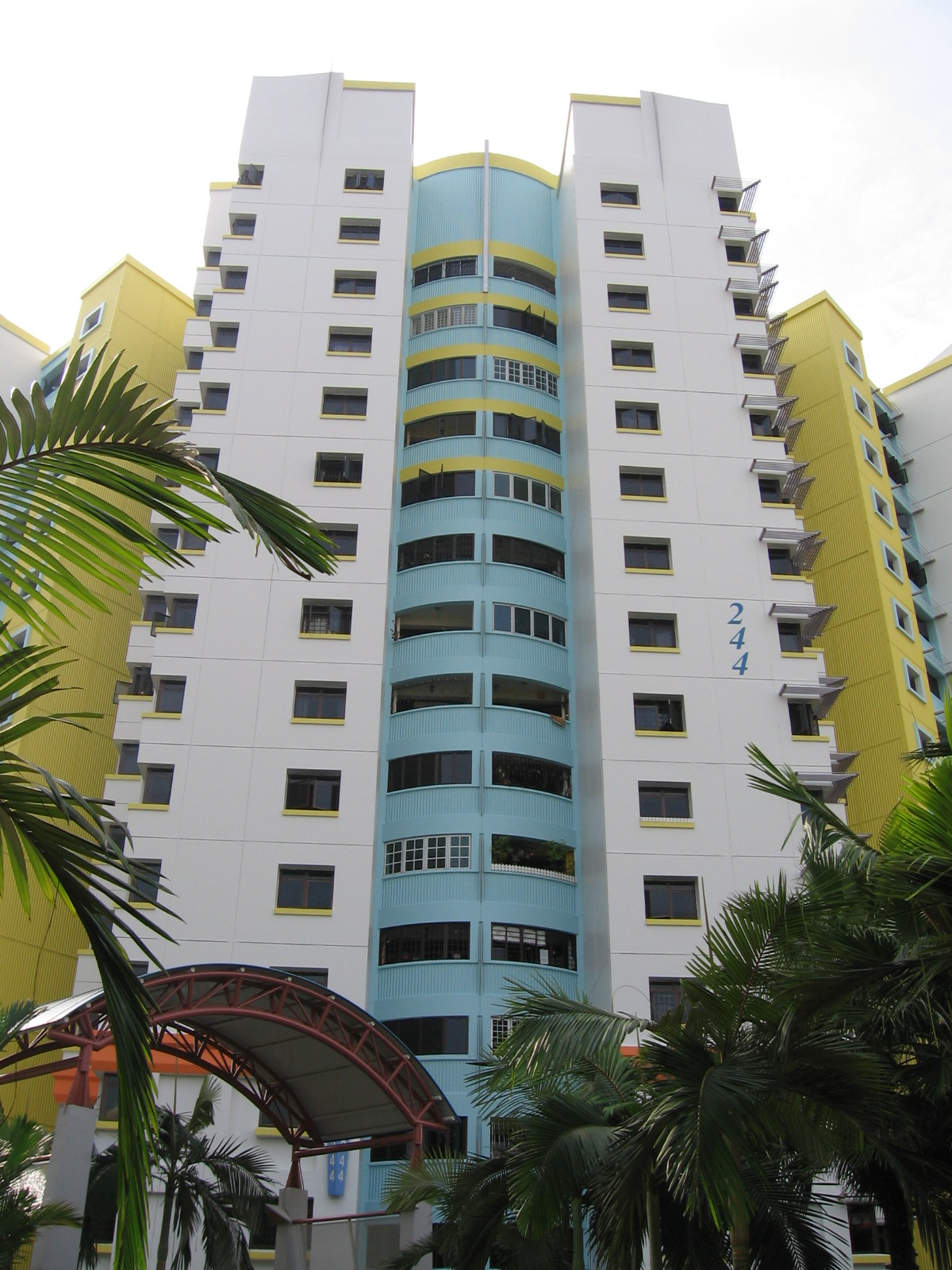
Compassvale Haven

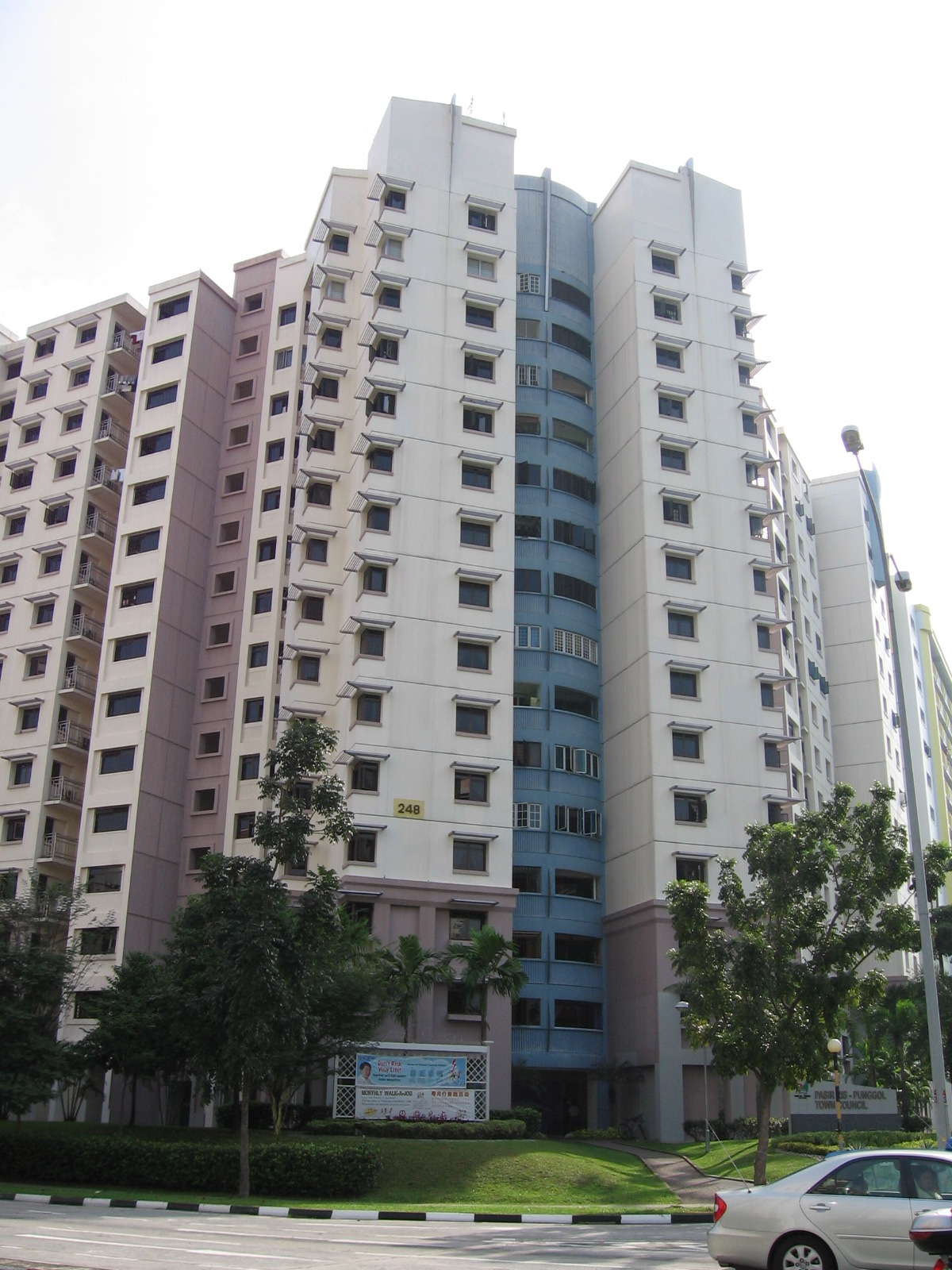
Compassvale Haven

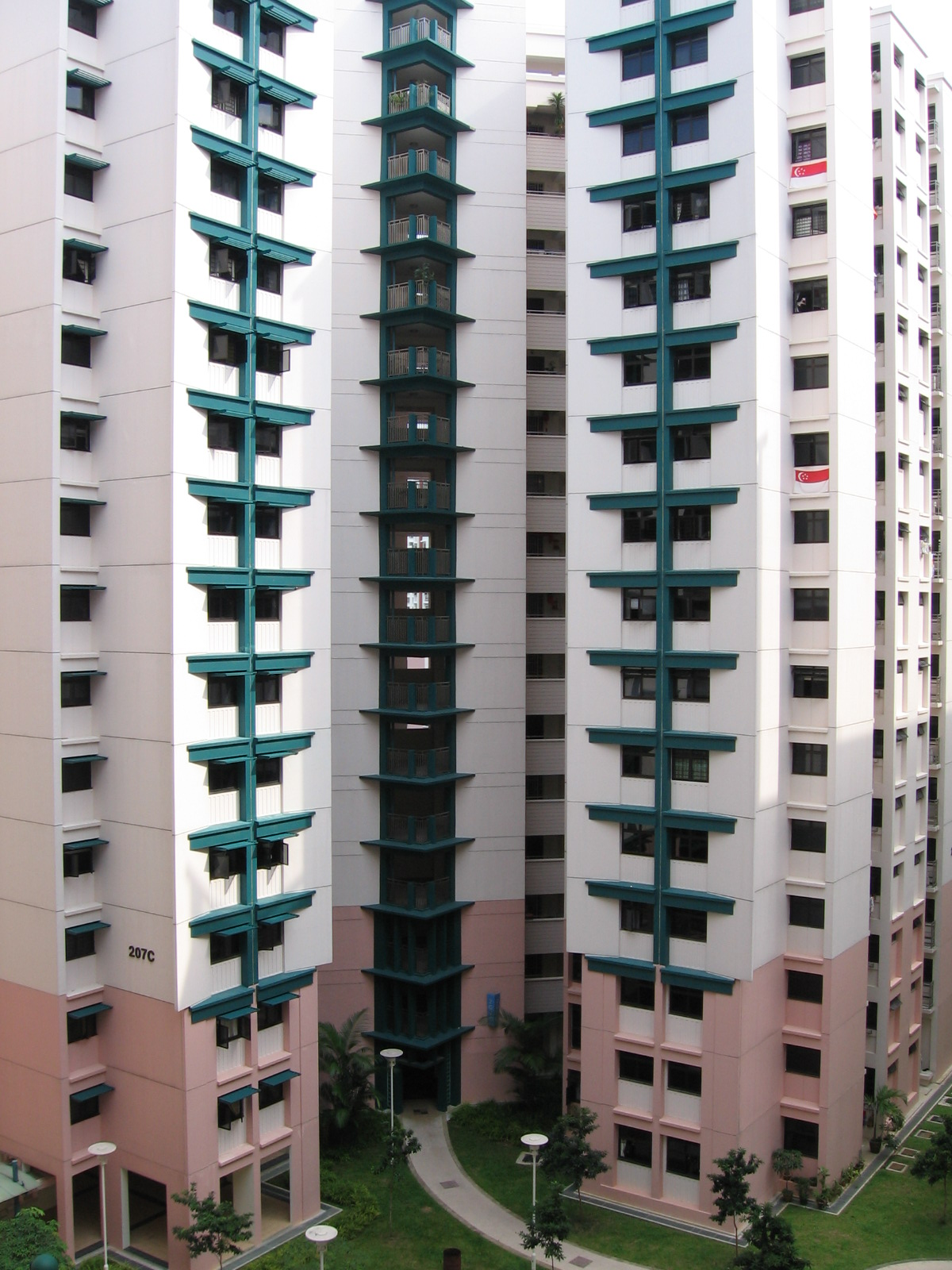
Compassvale Lane

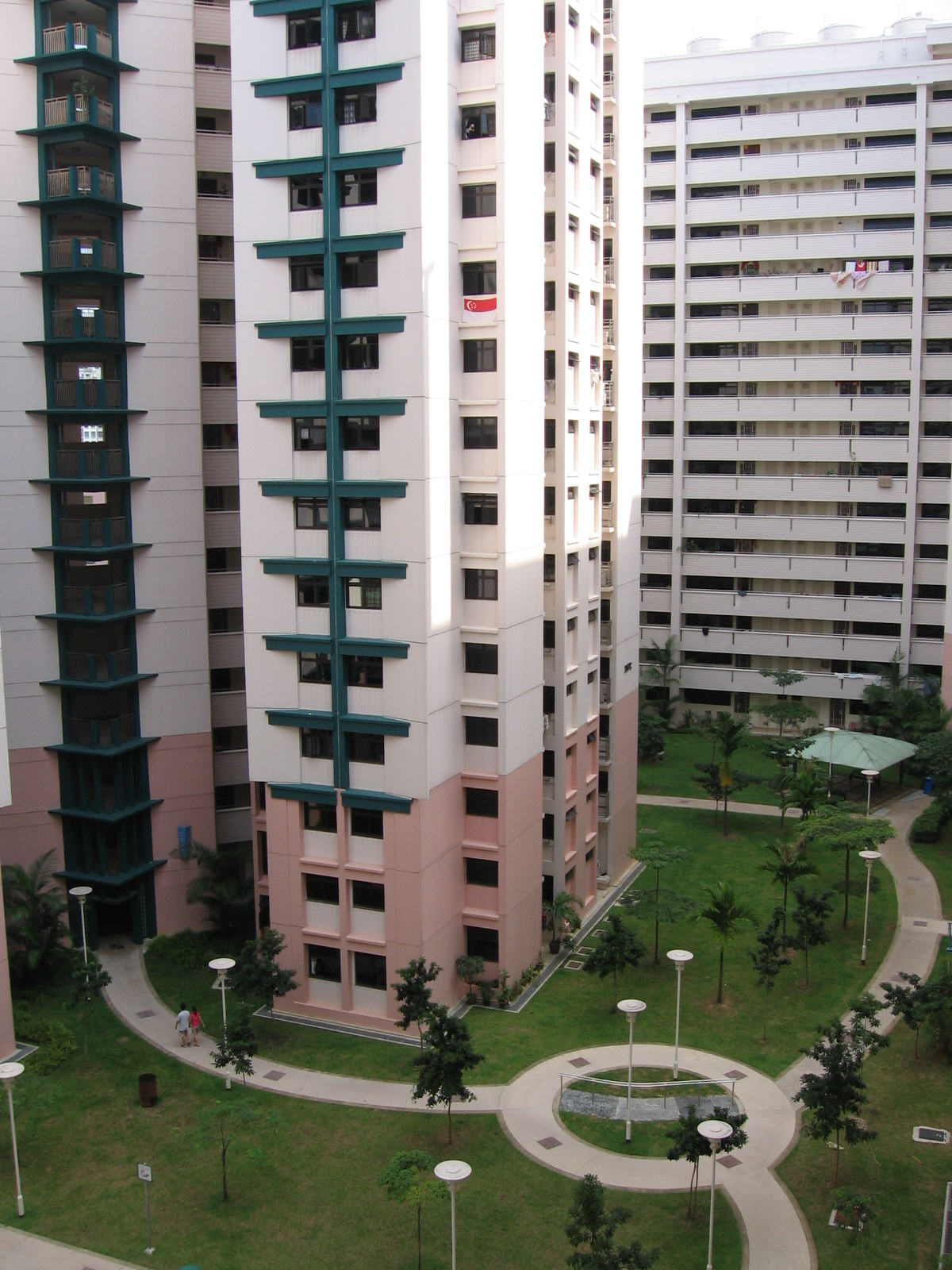
Compassvale Lane

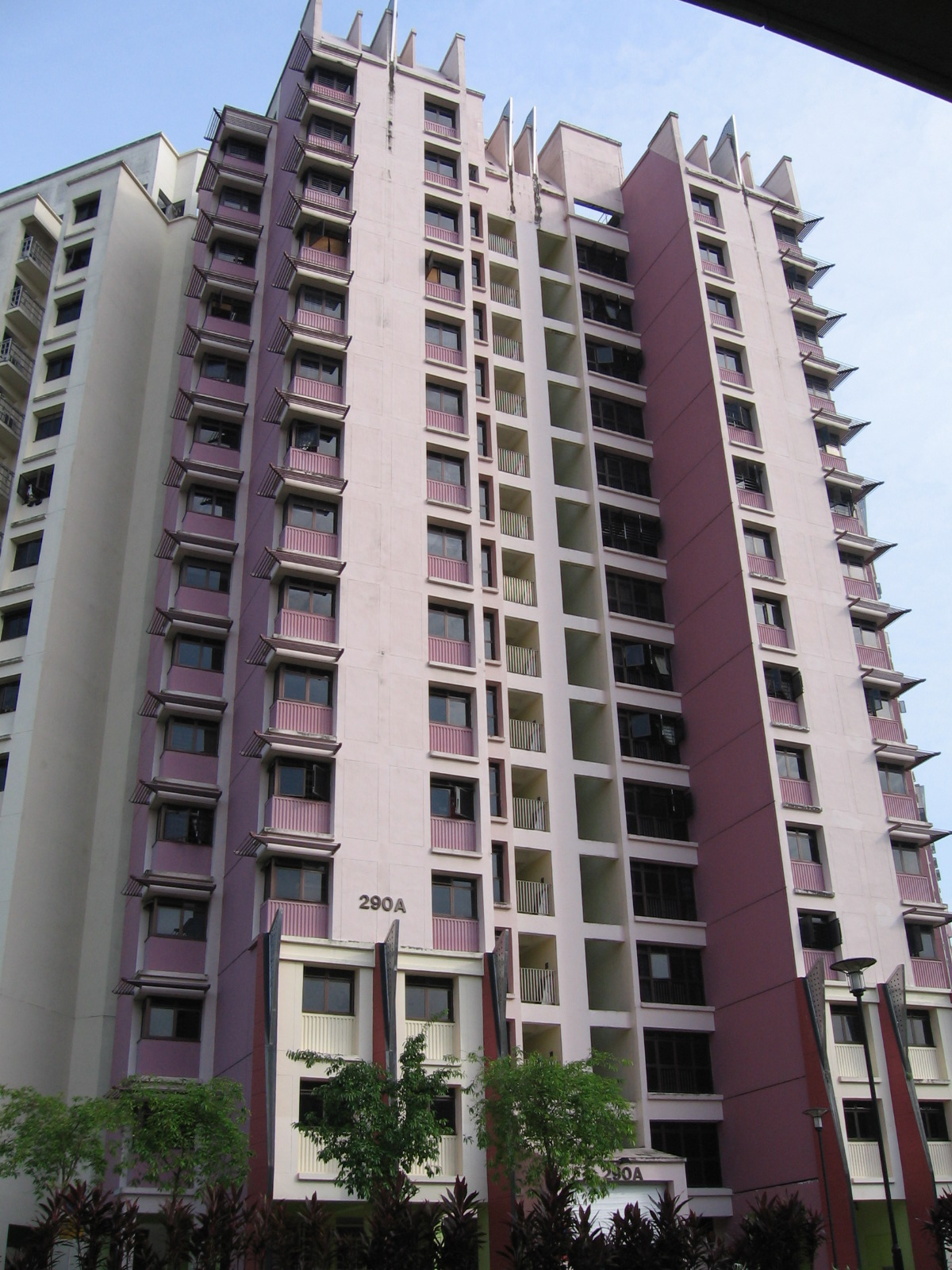
Compassvale Lodge

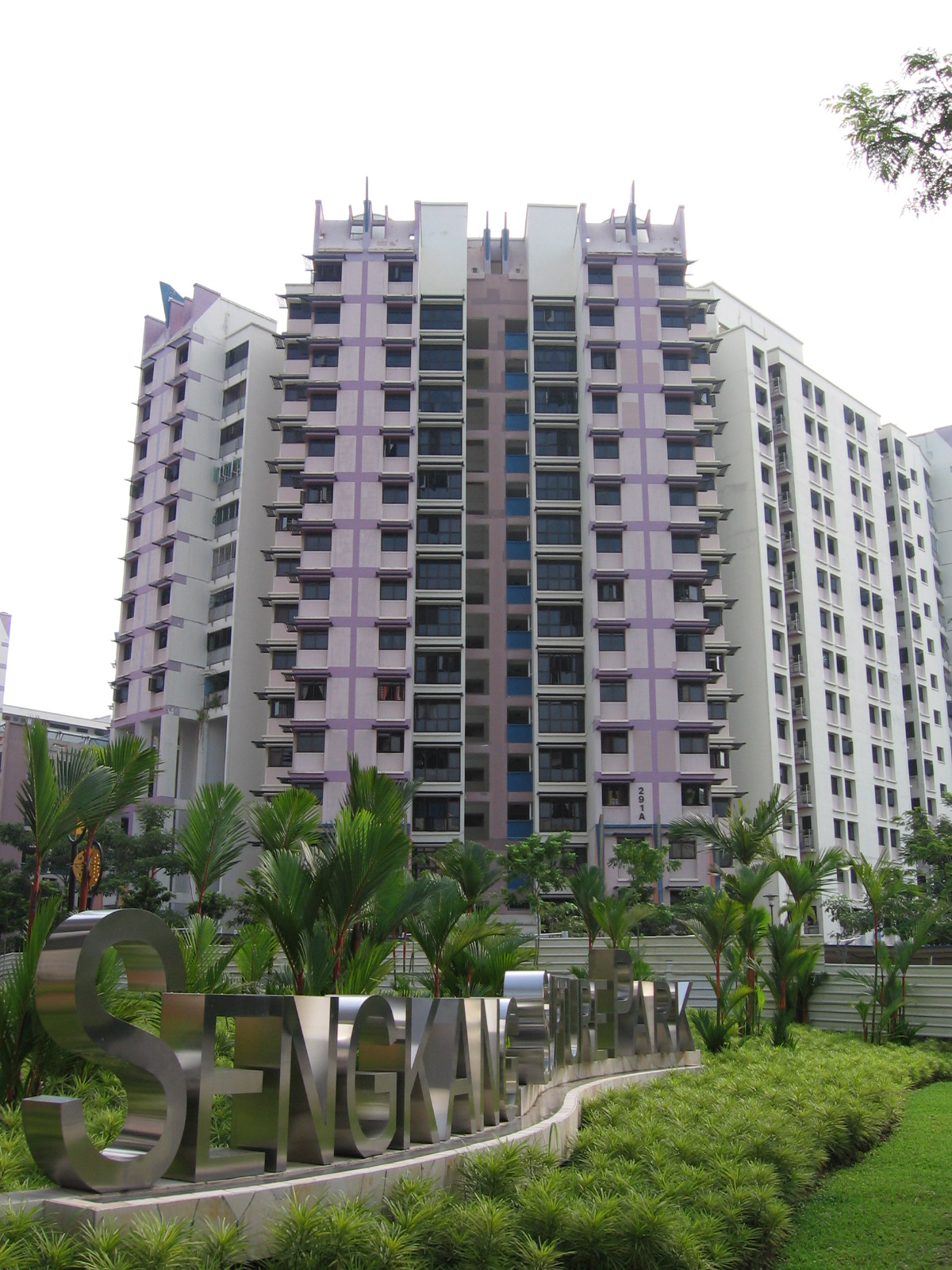
Compassvale Lodge

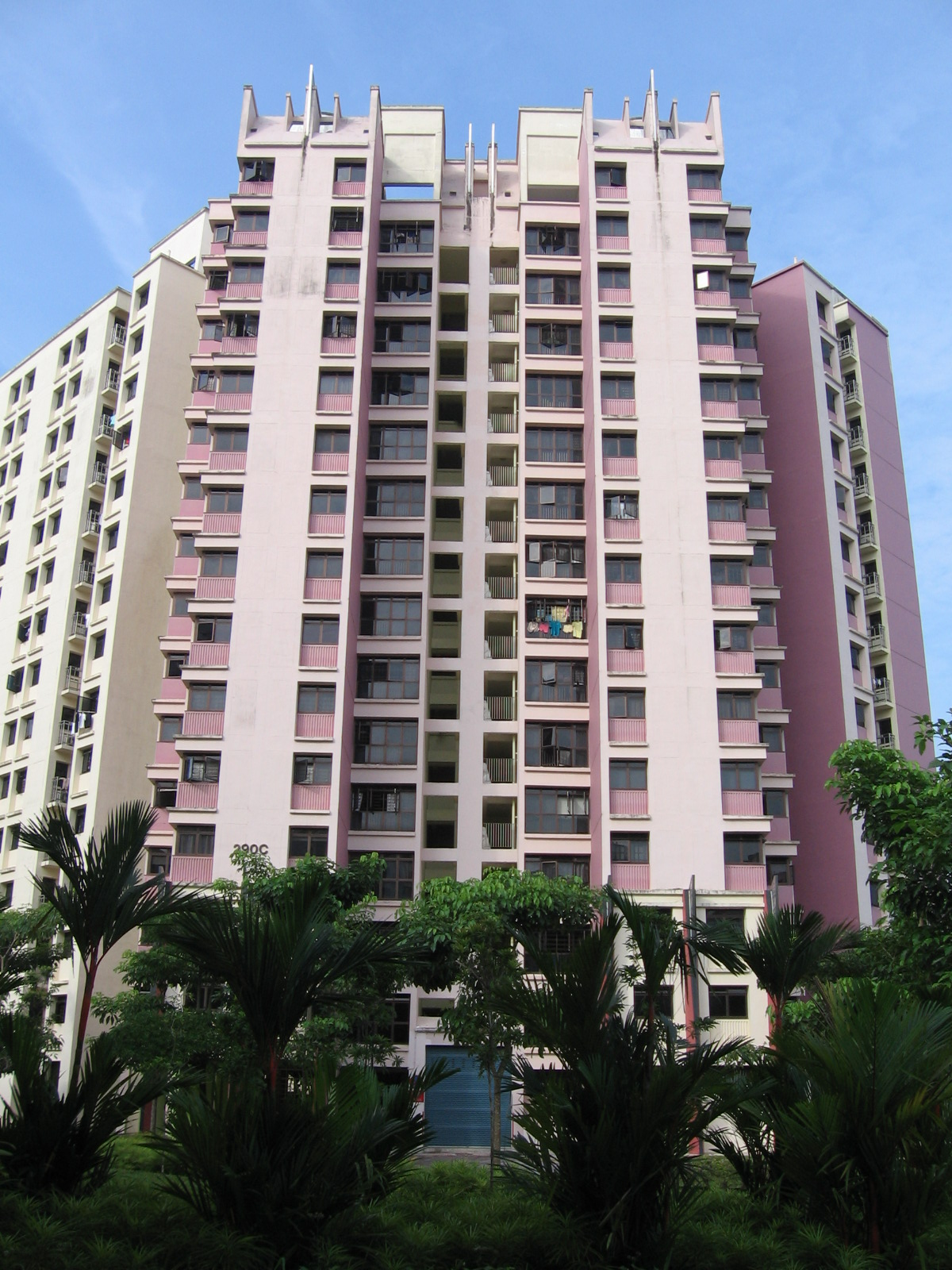
Compassvale Lodge

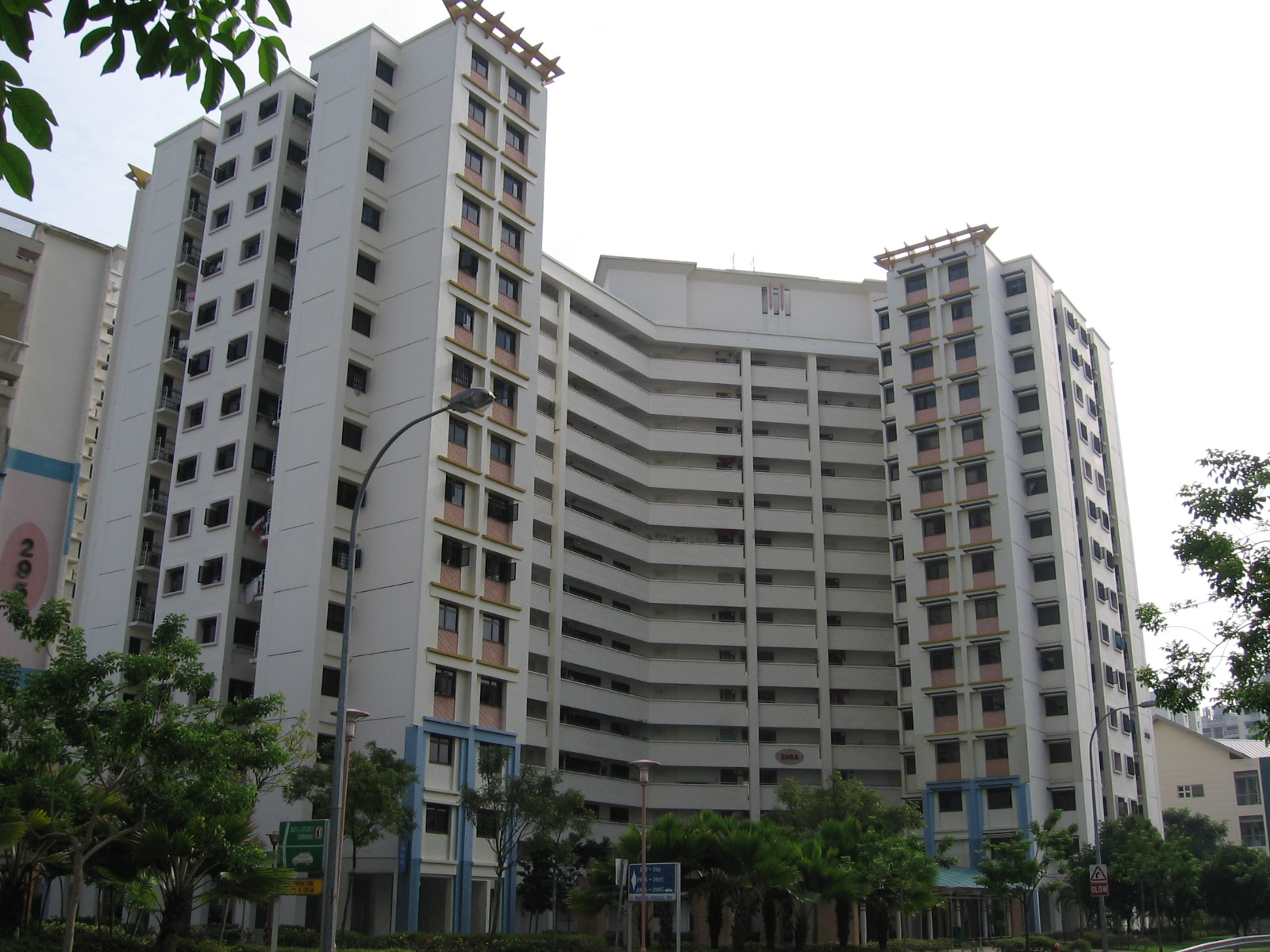
Compassvale Lodge

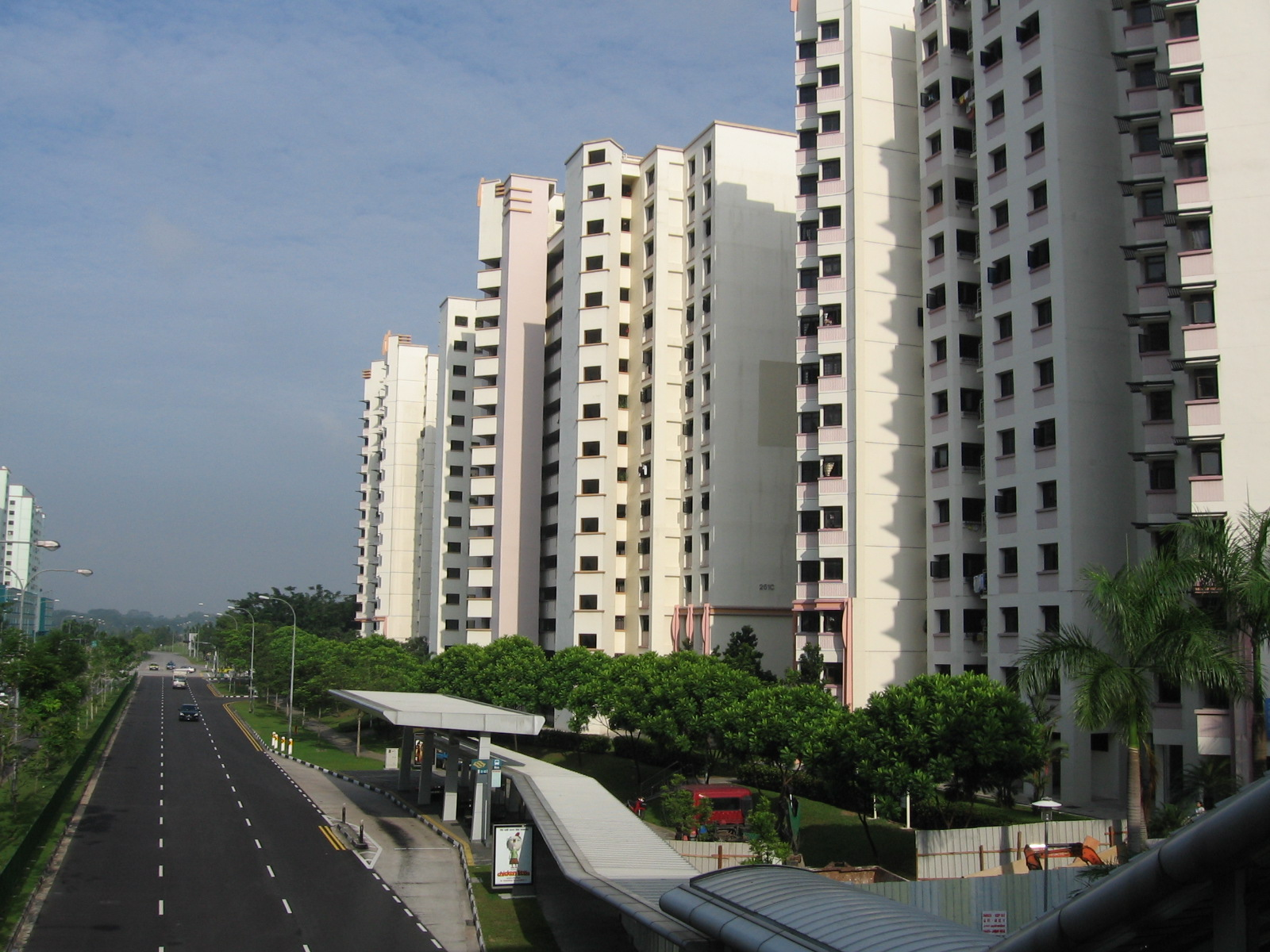
Compassvale North Gate

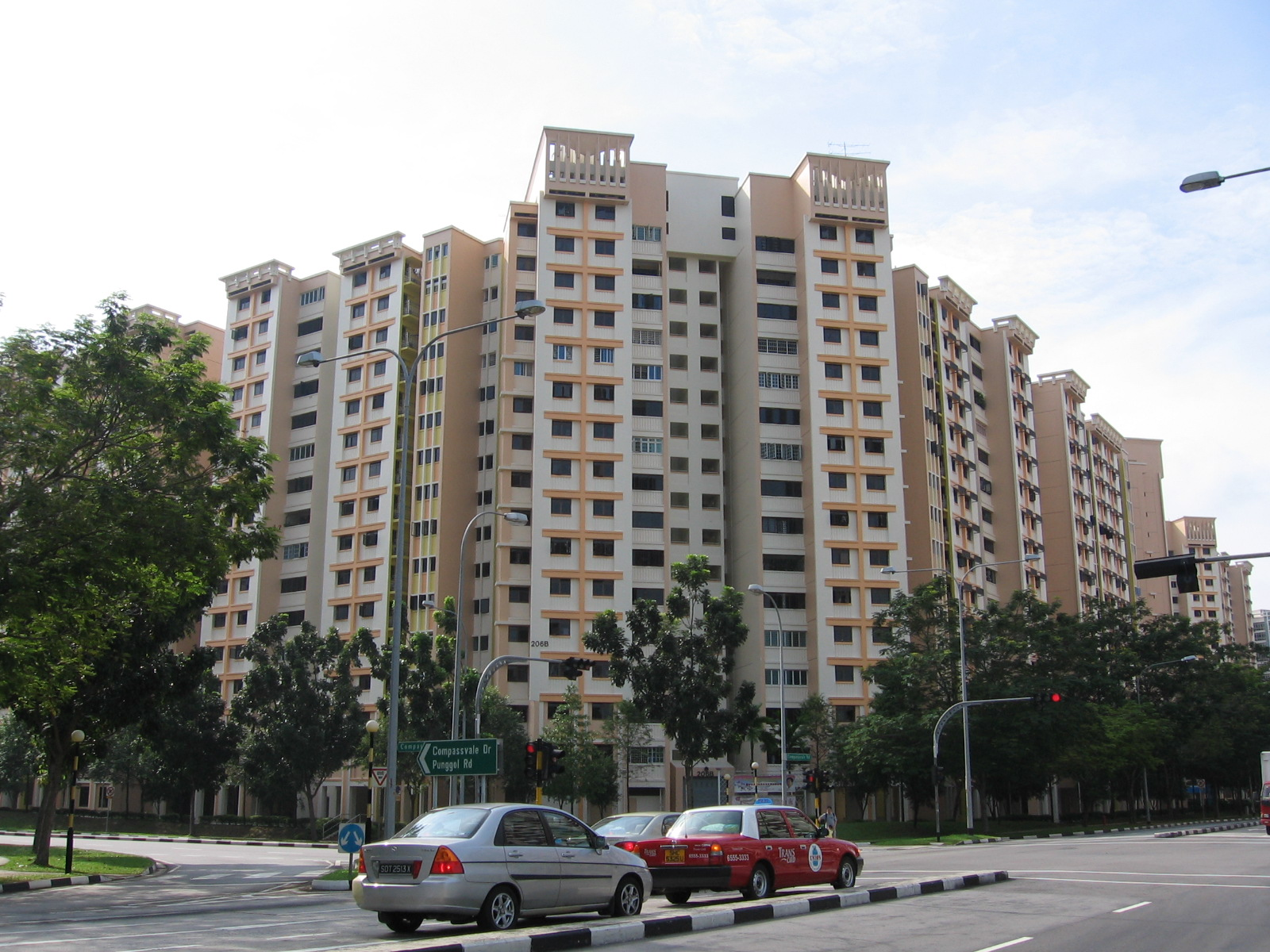
Compassvale Place

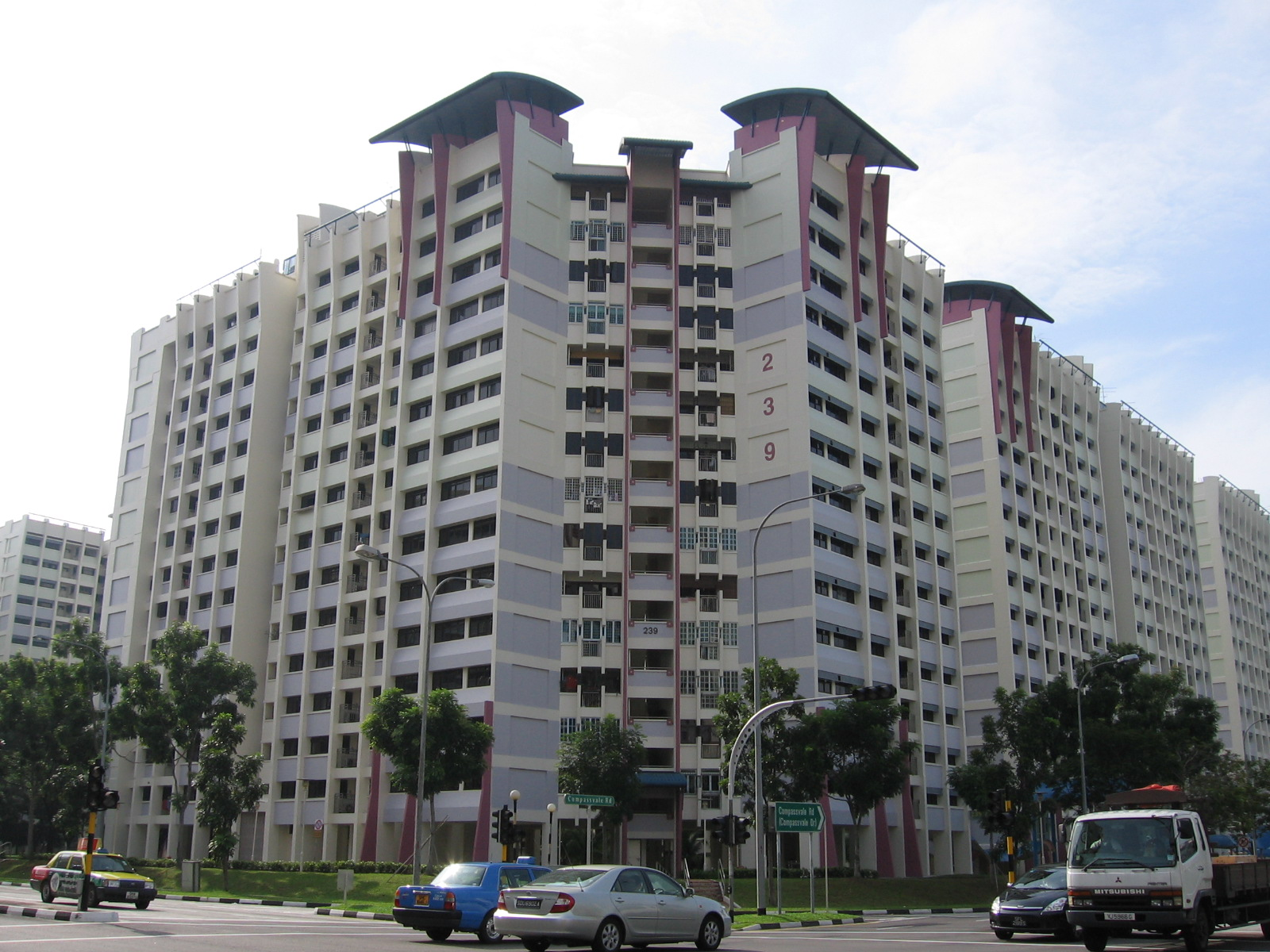
Compassvale Plains

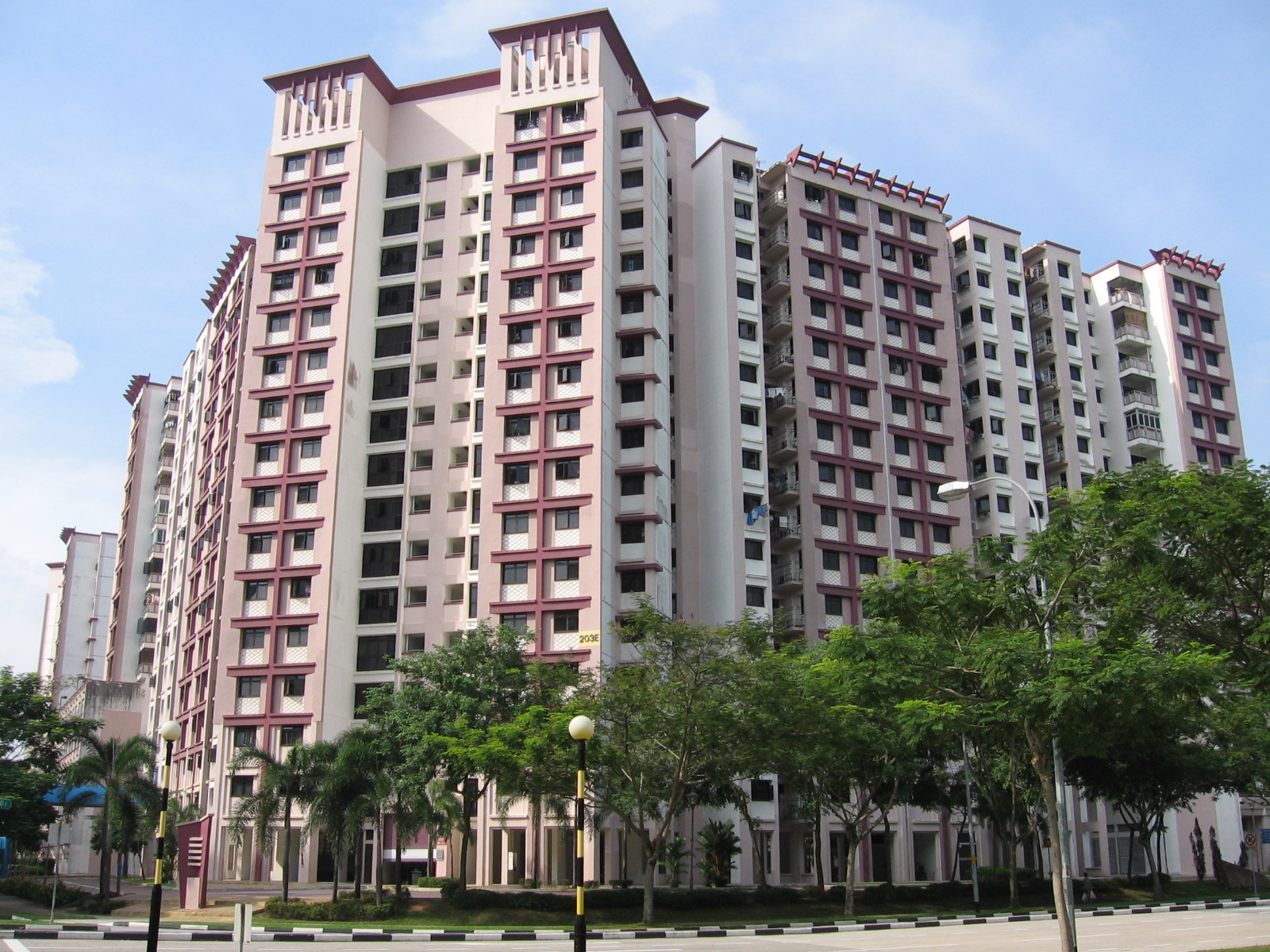
Compassvale South Gate

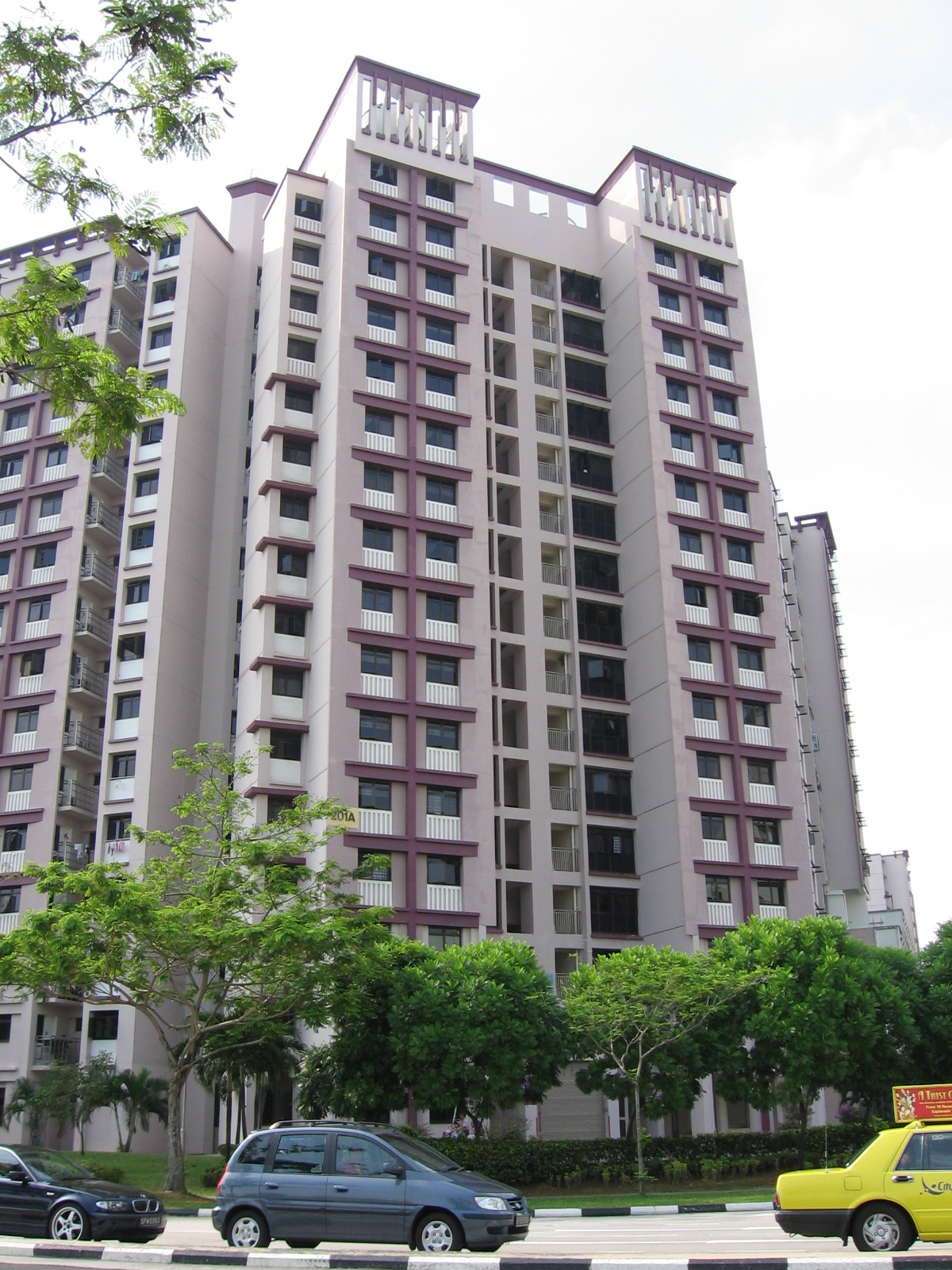
Compassvale South Gate

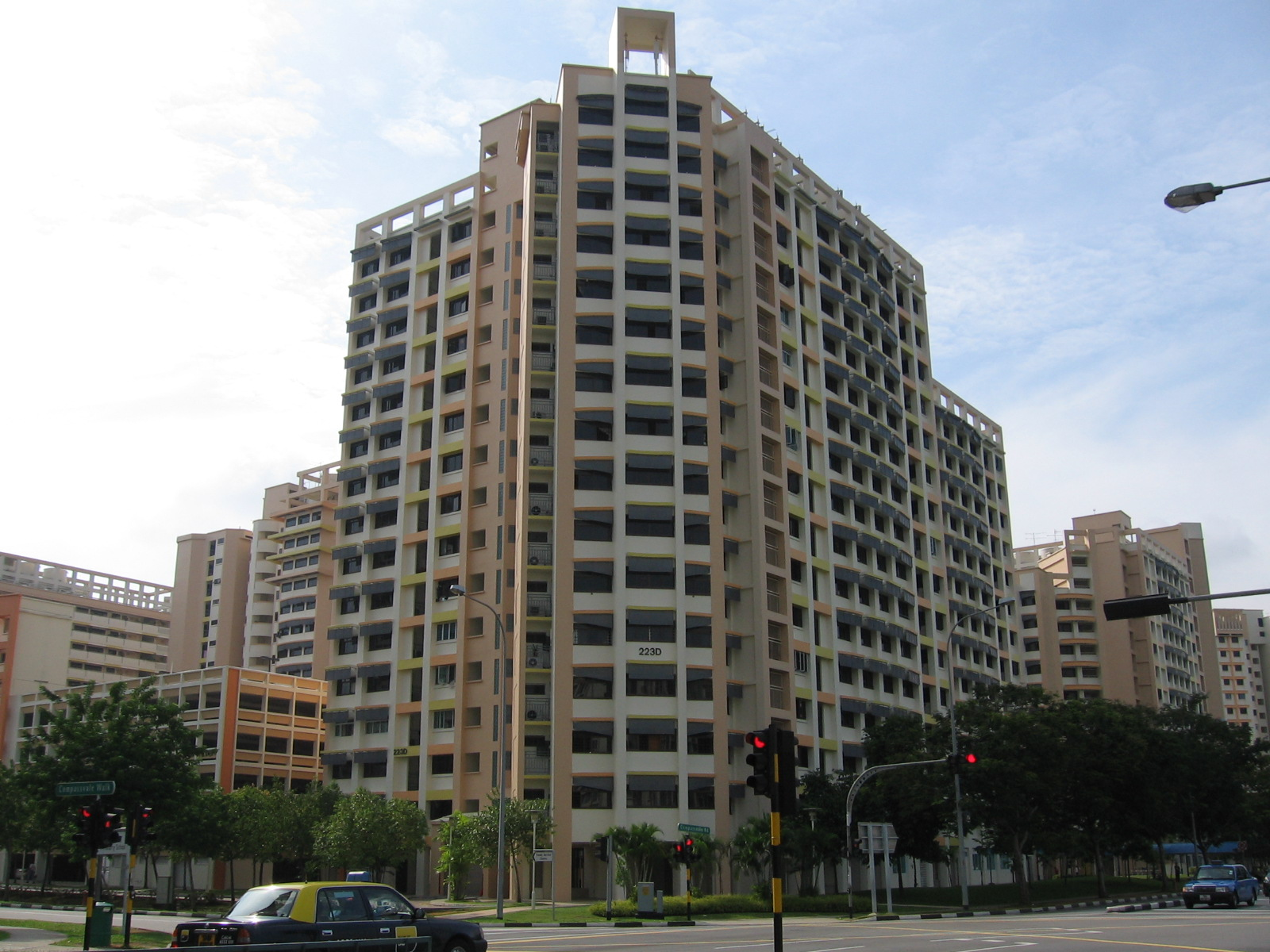
Compassvale Vista

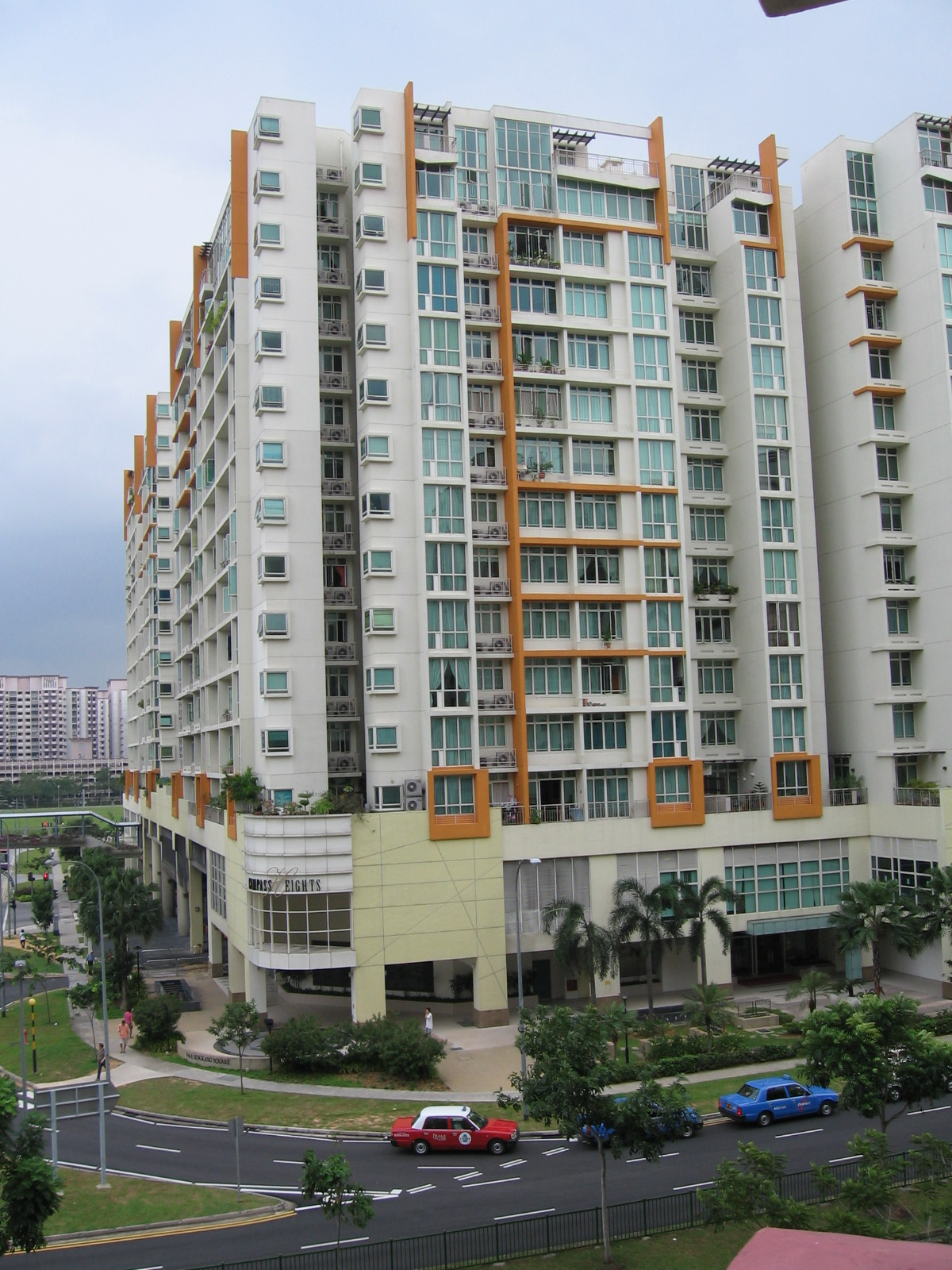
Compass Heights condominium

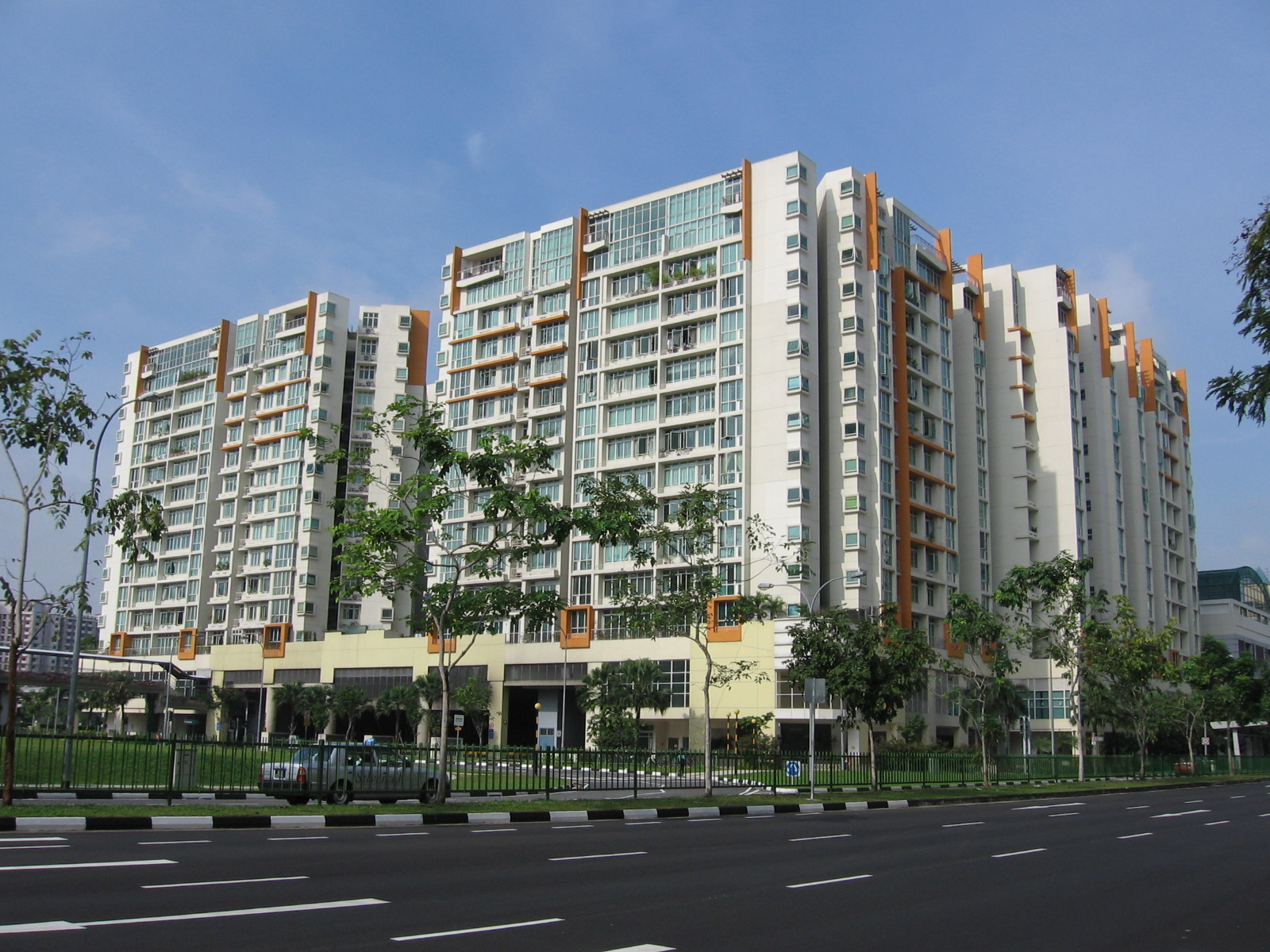
Compass Heights condominium

Educational institutions

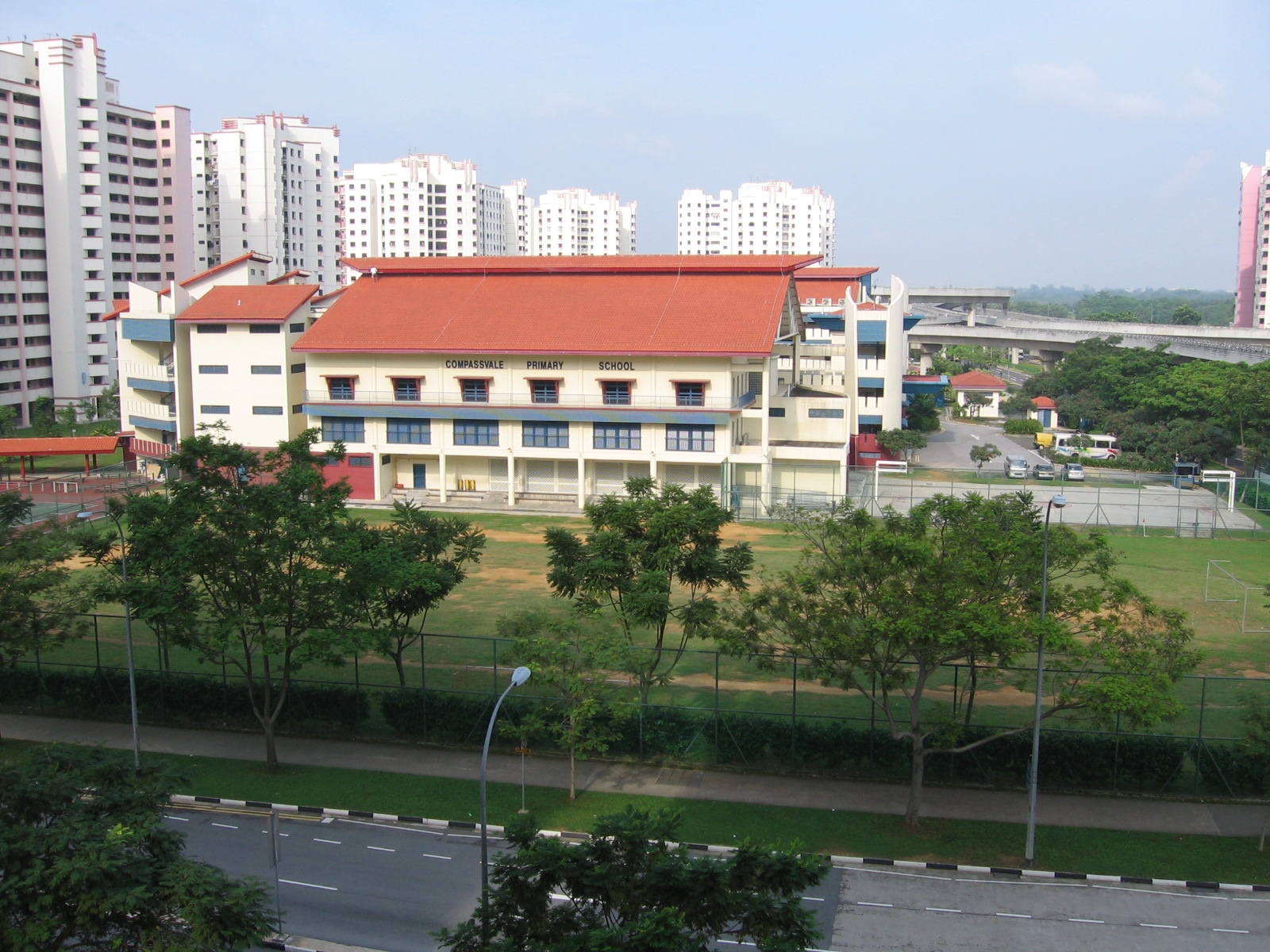
Compassvale Primary School

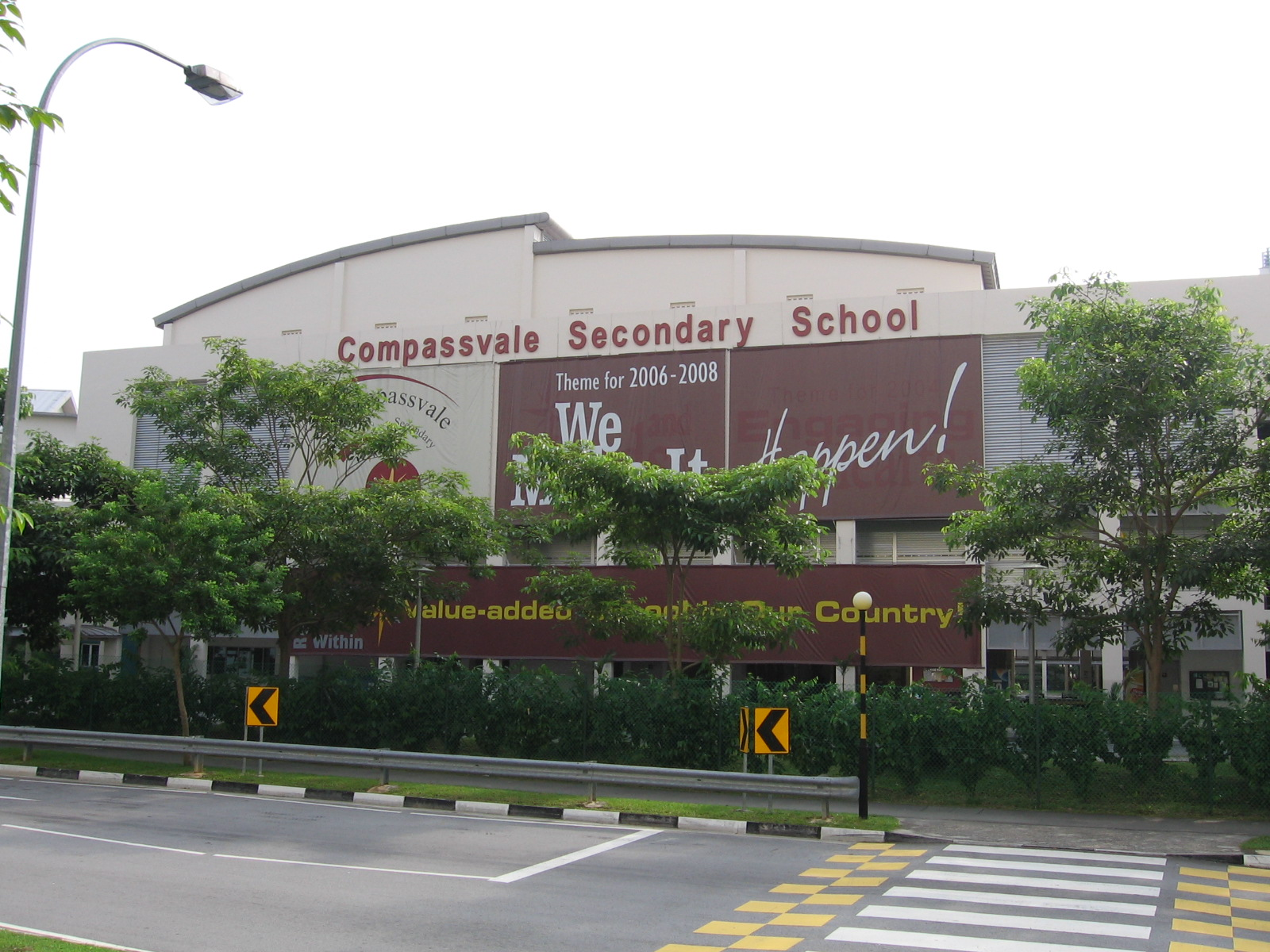
Compassvale Secondary School

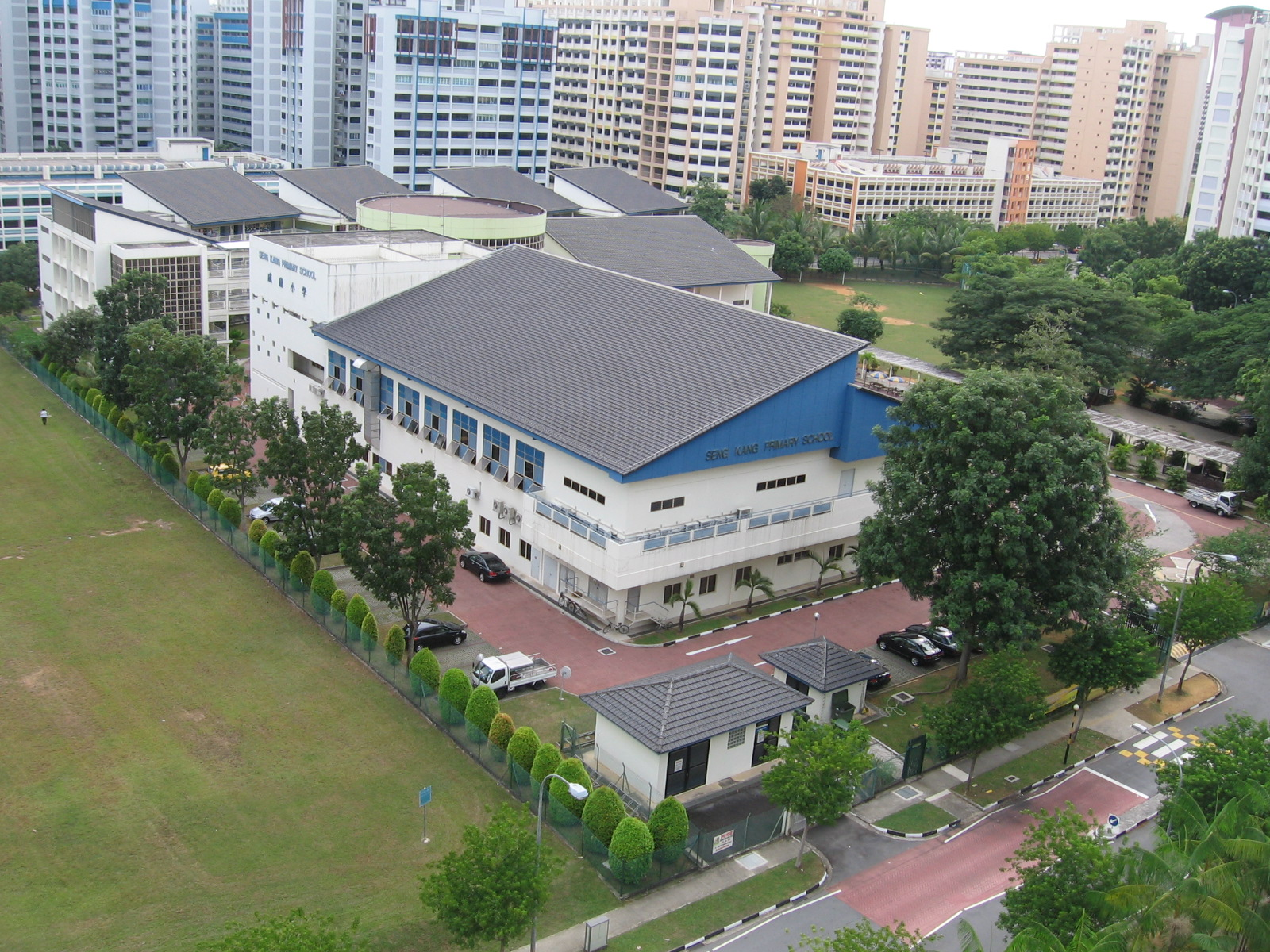
Seng Kang Primary School

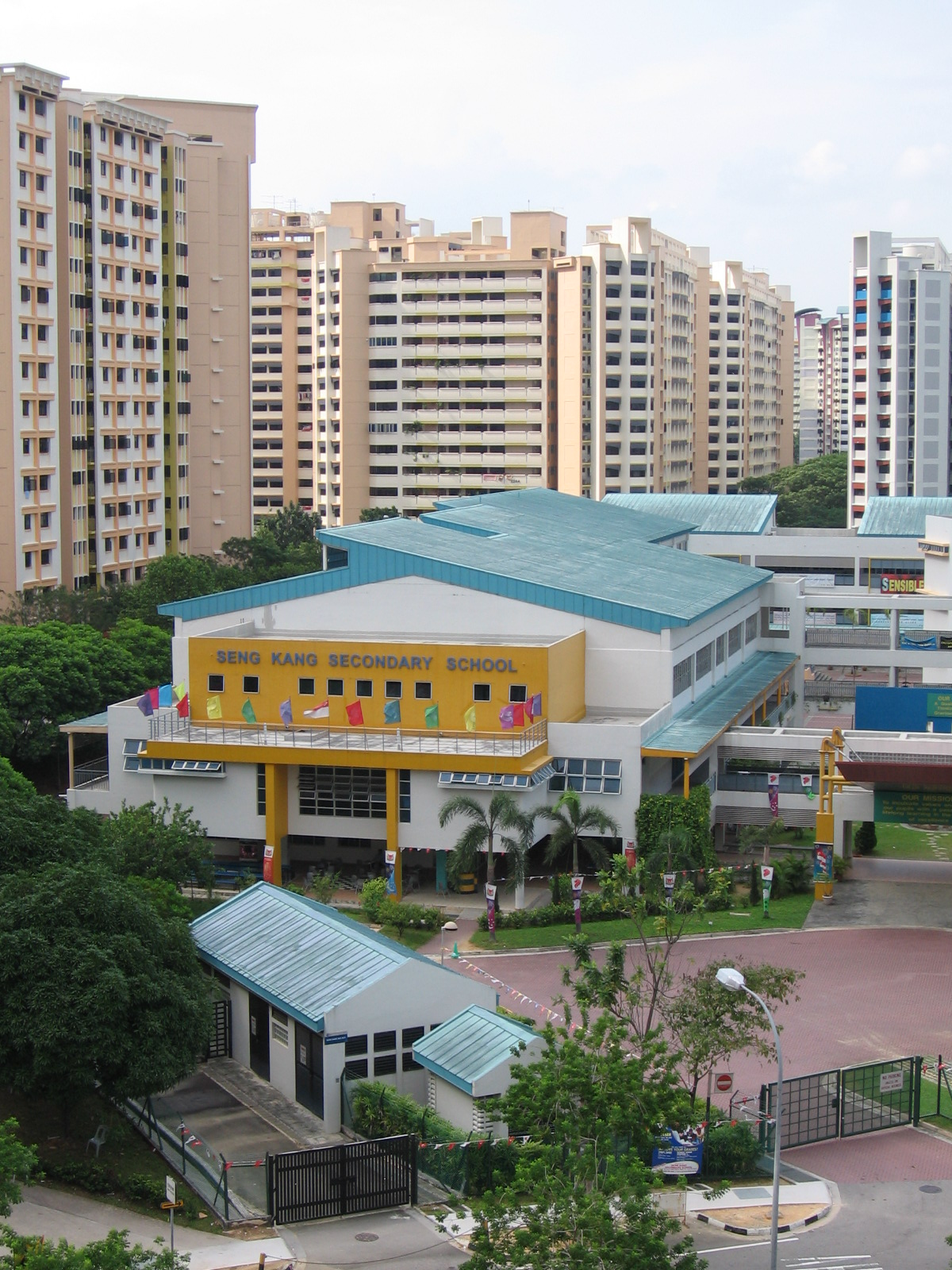
Seng Kang Secondary School

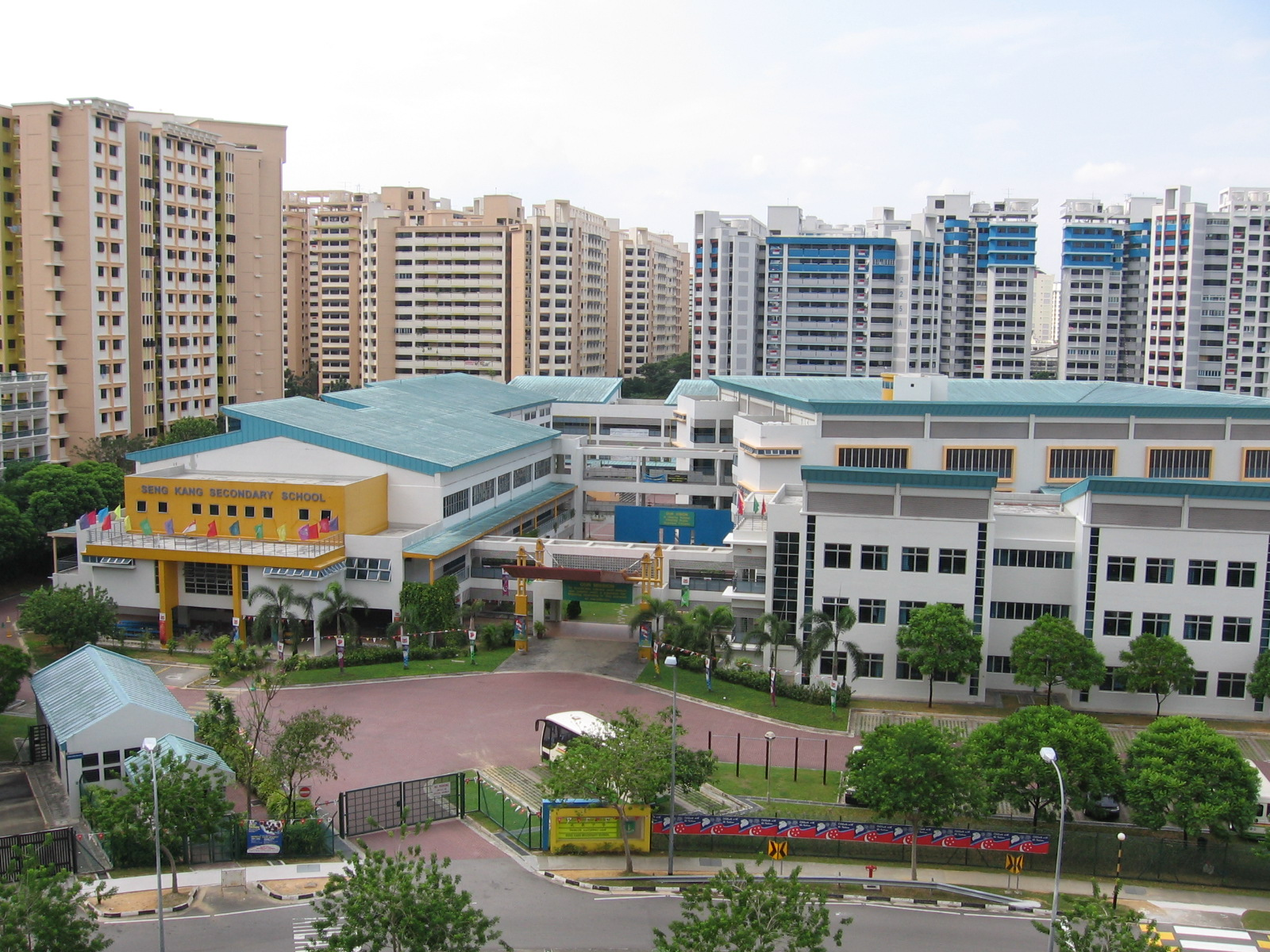
Seng Kang Secondary School

Sengkang Sculpture Park

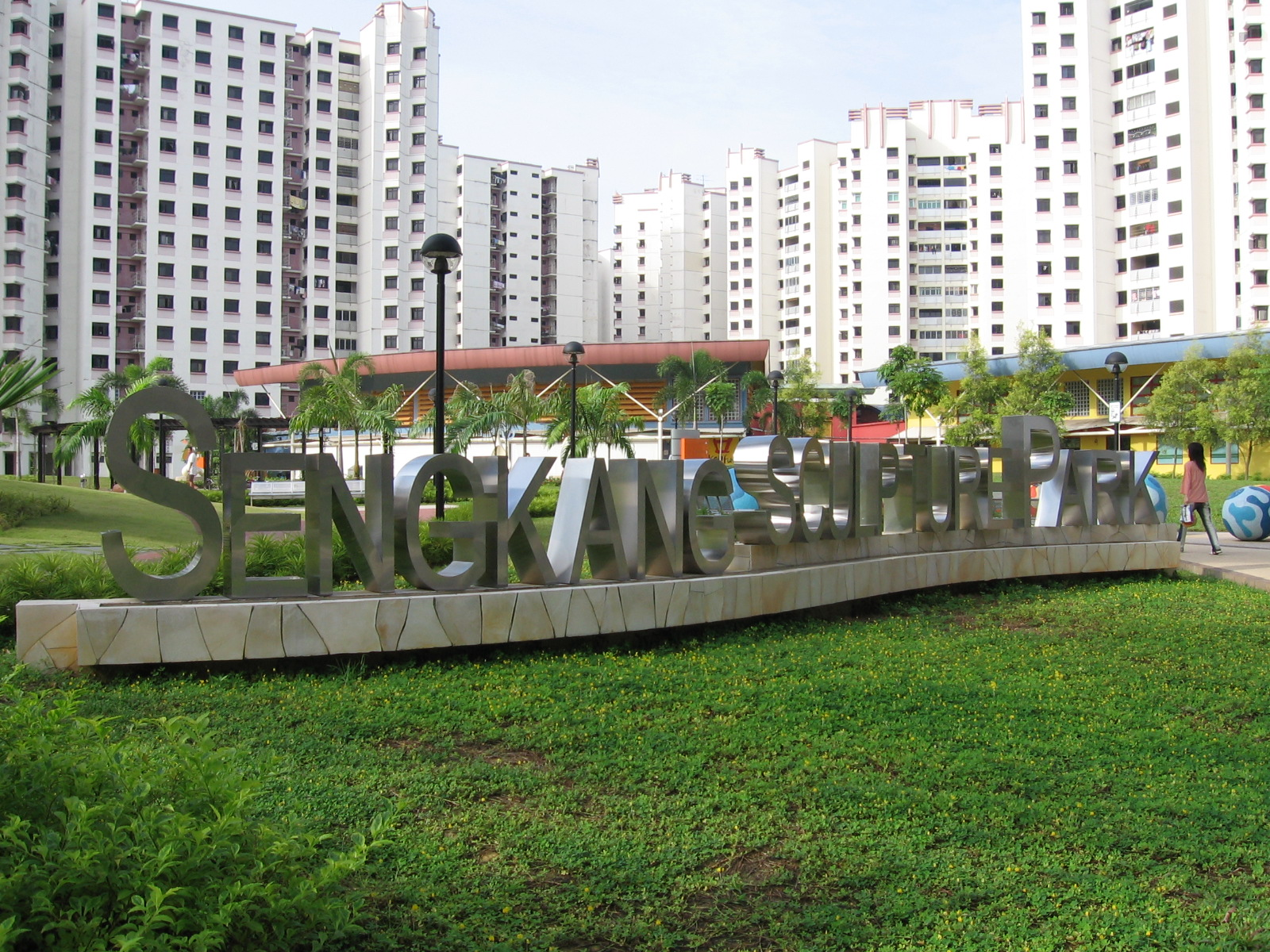

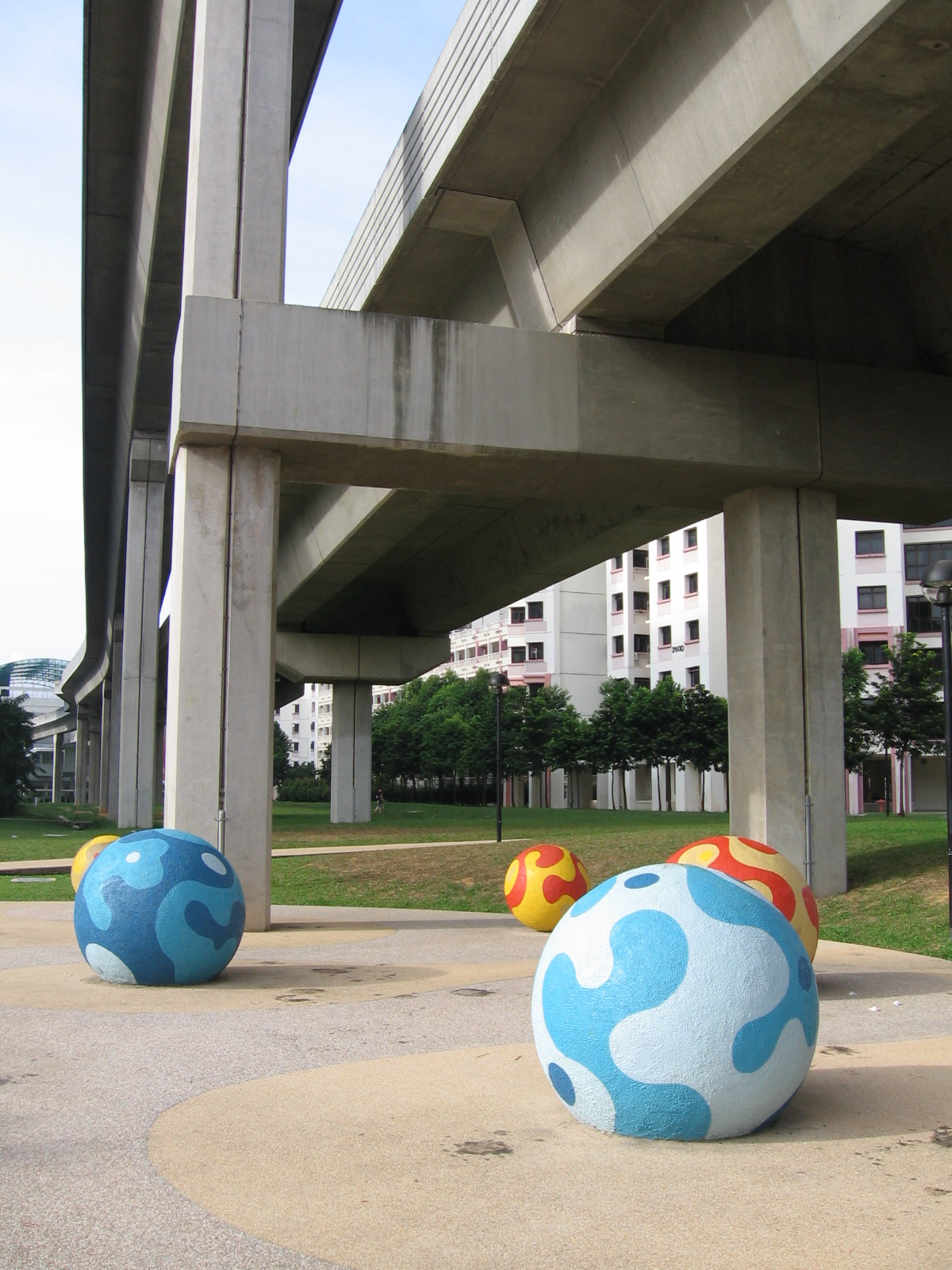

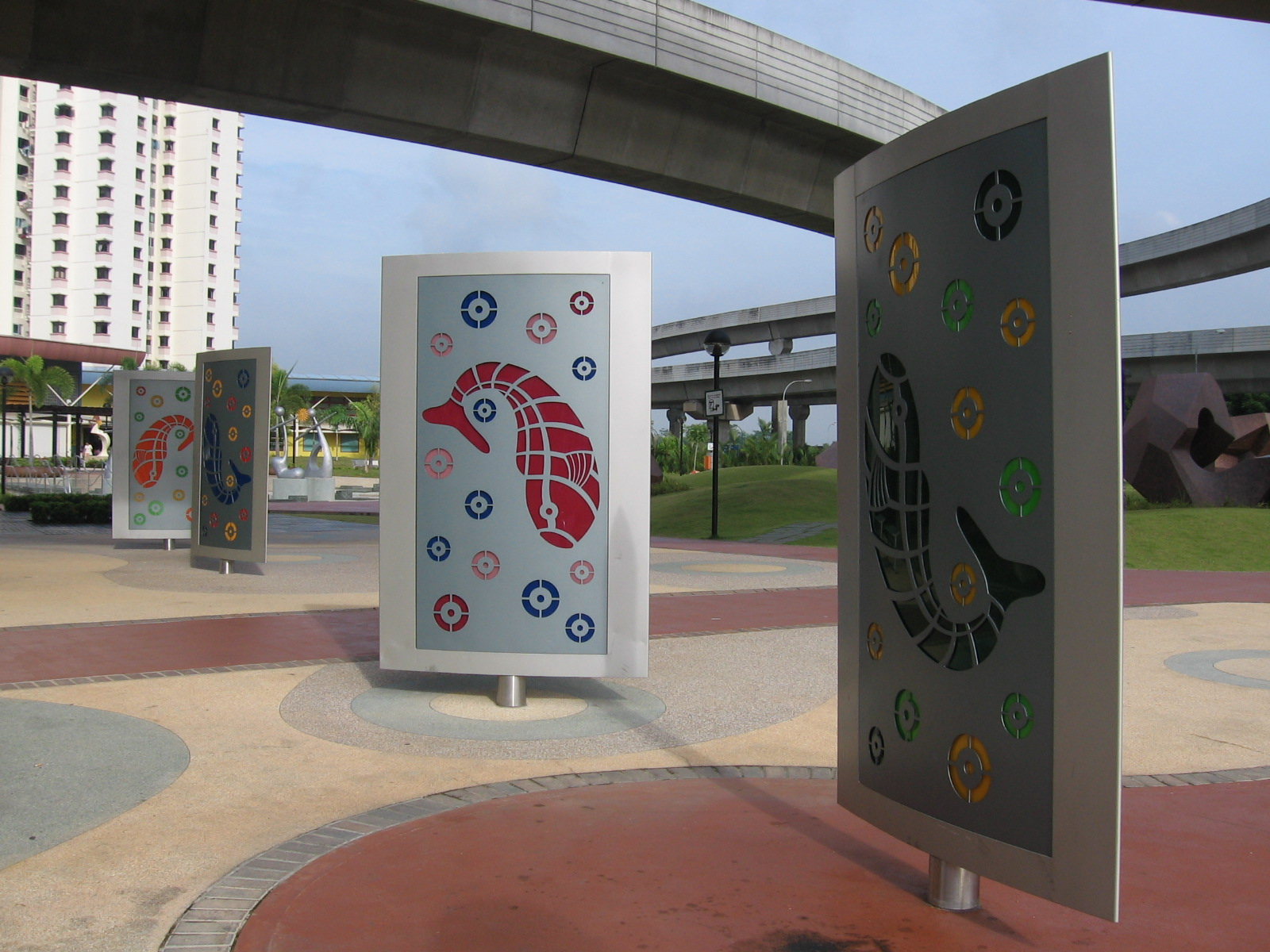

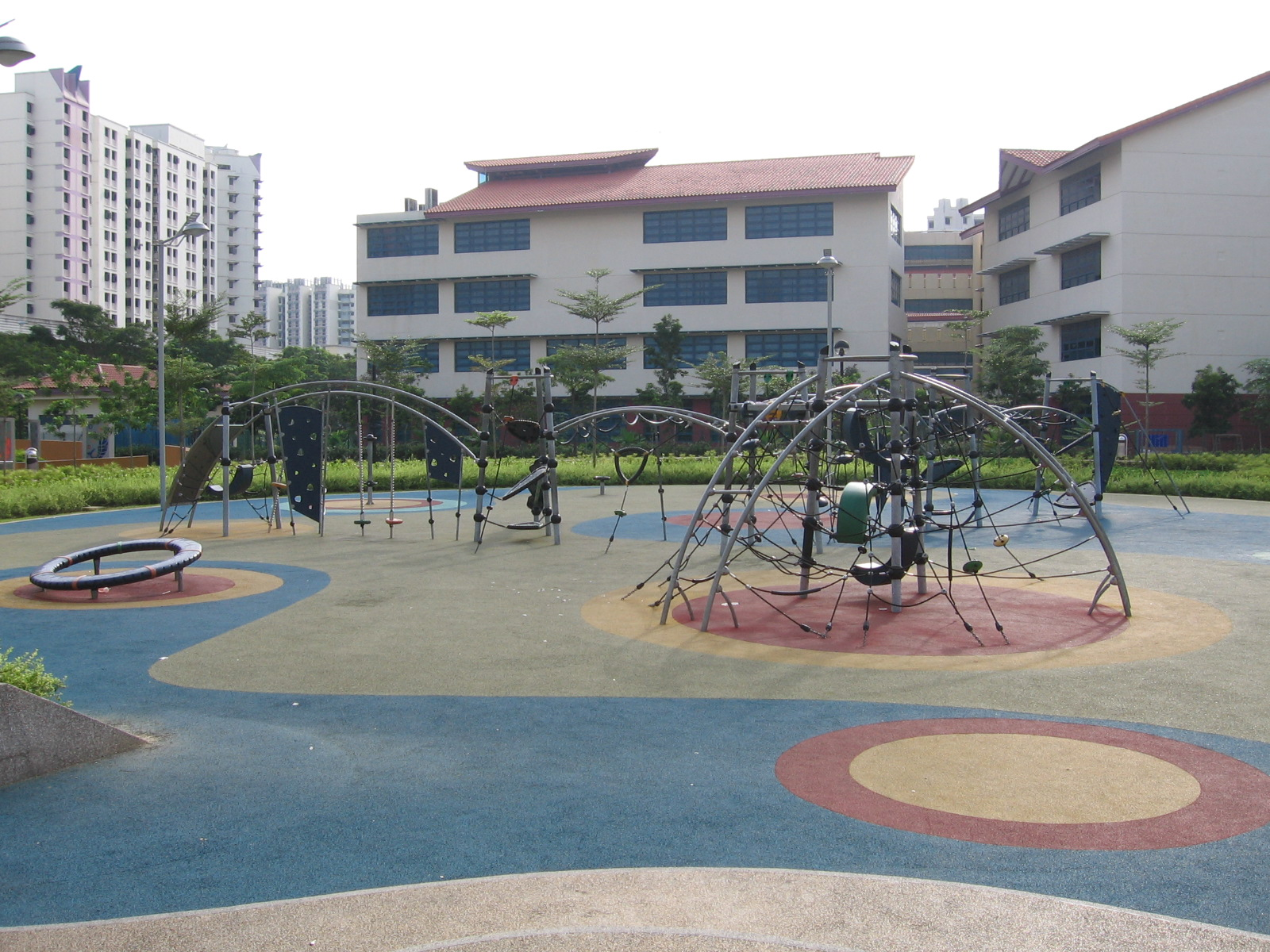

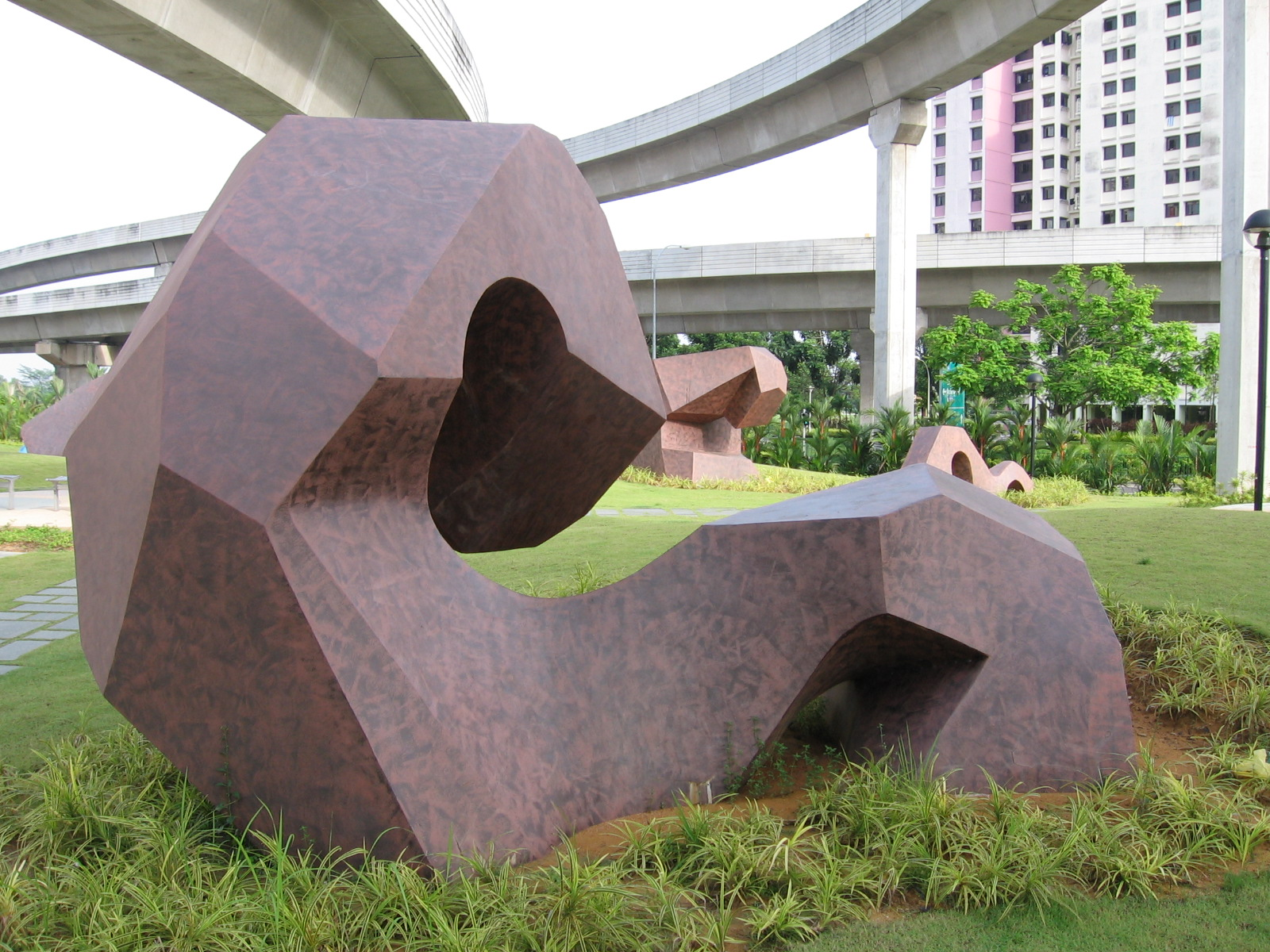

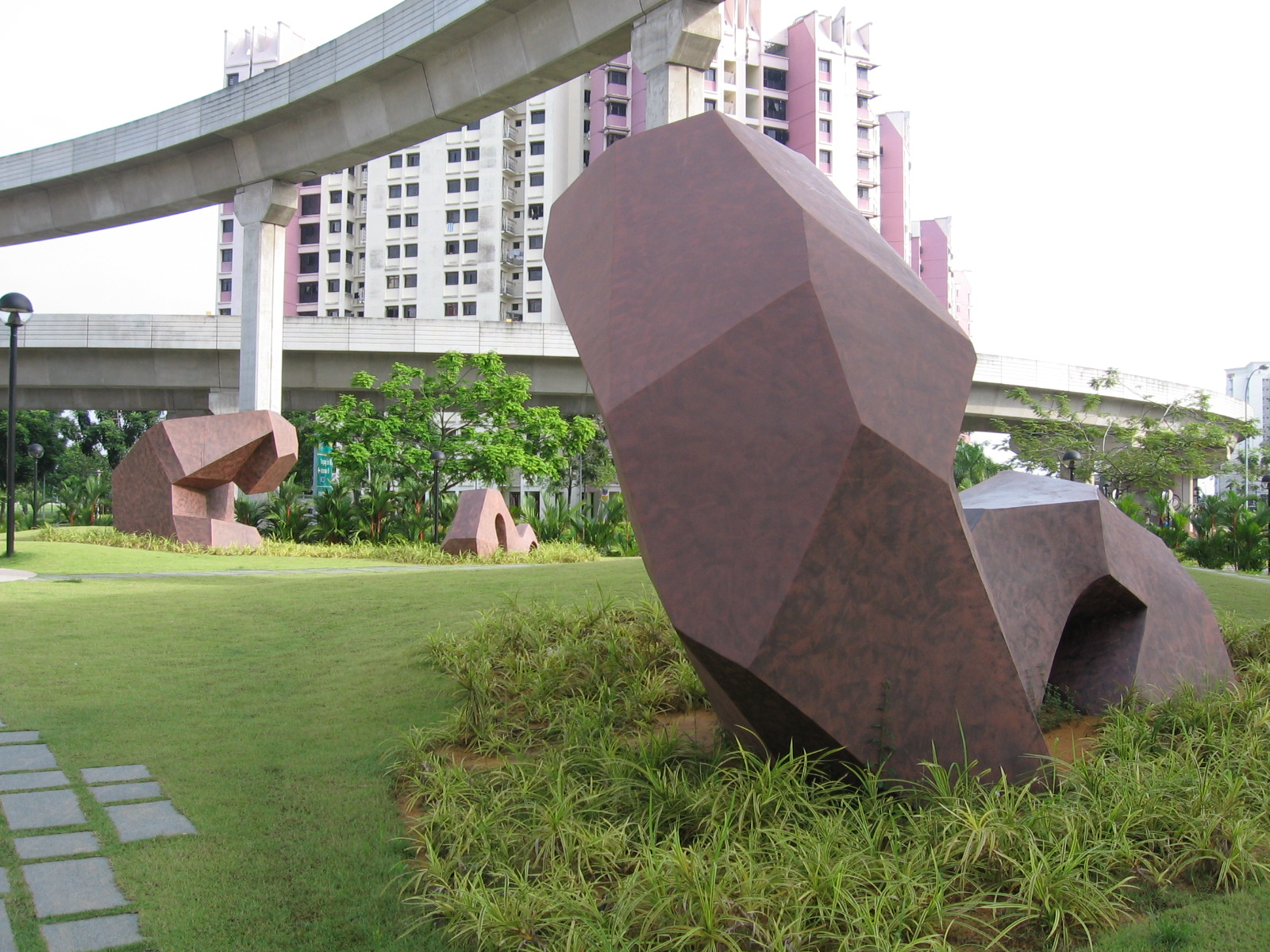

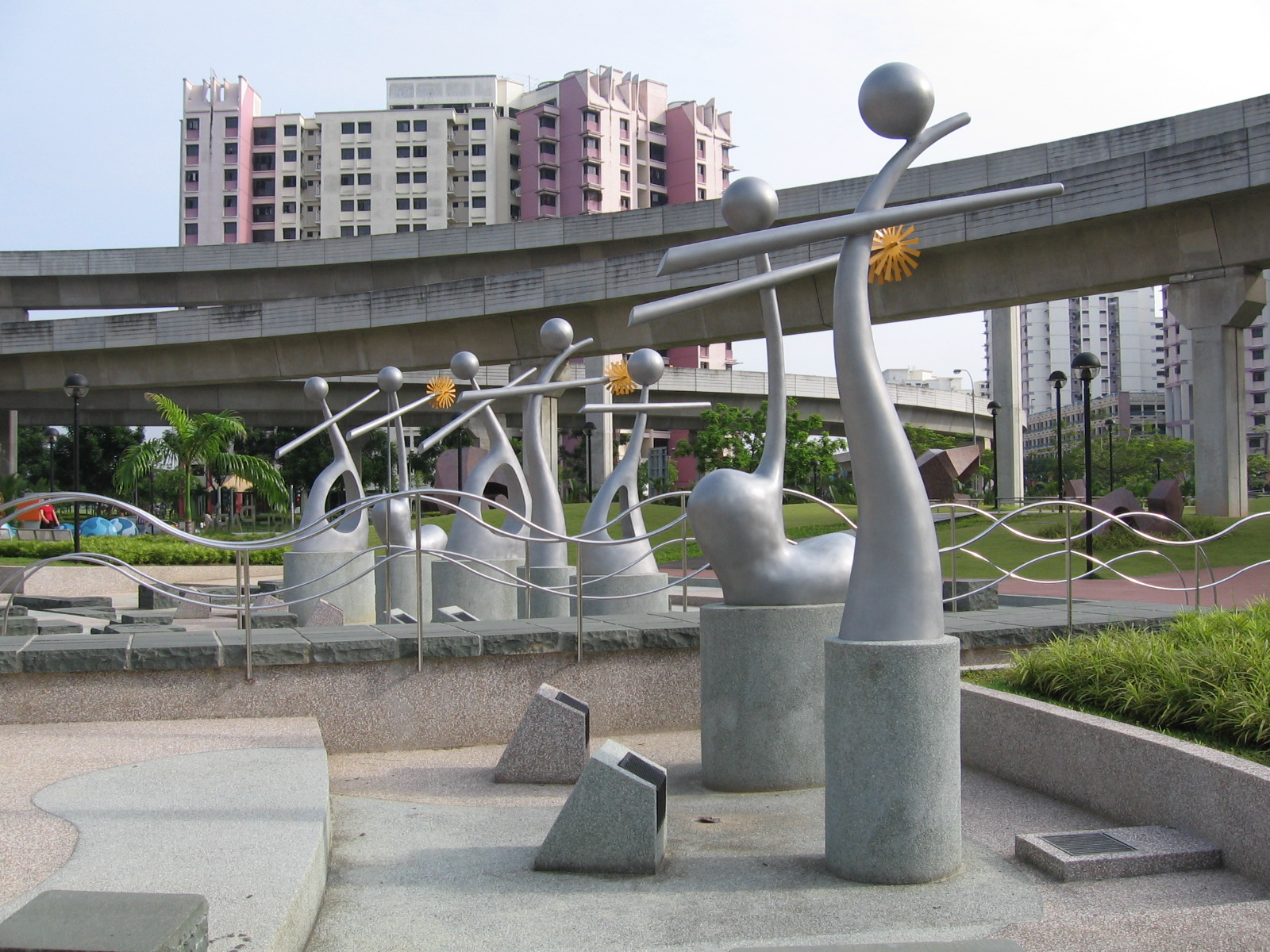

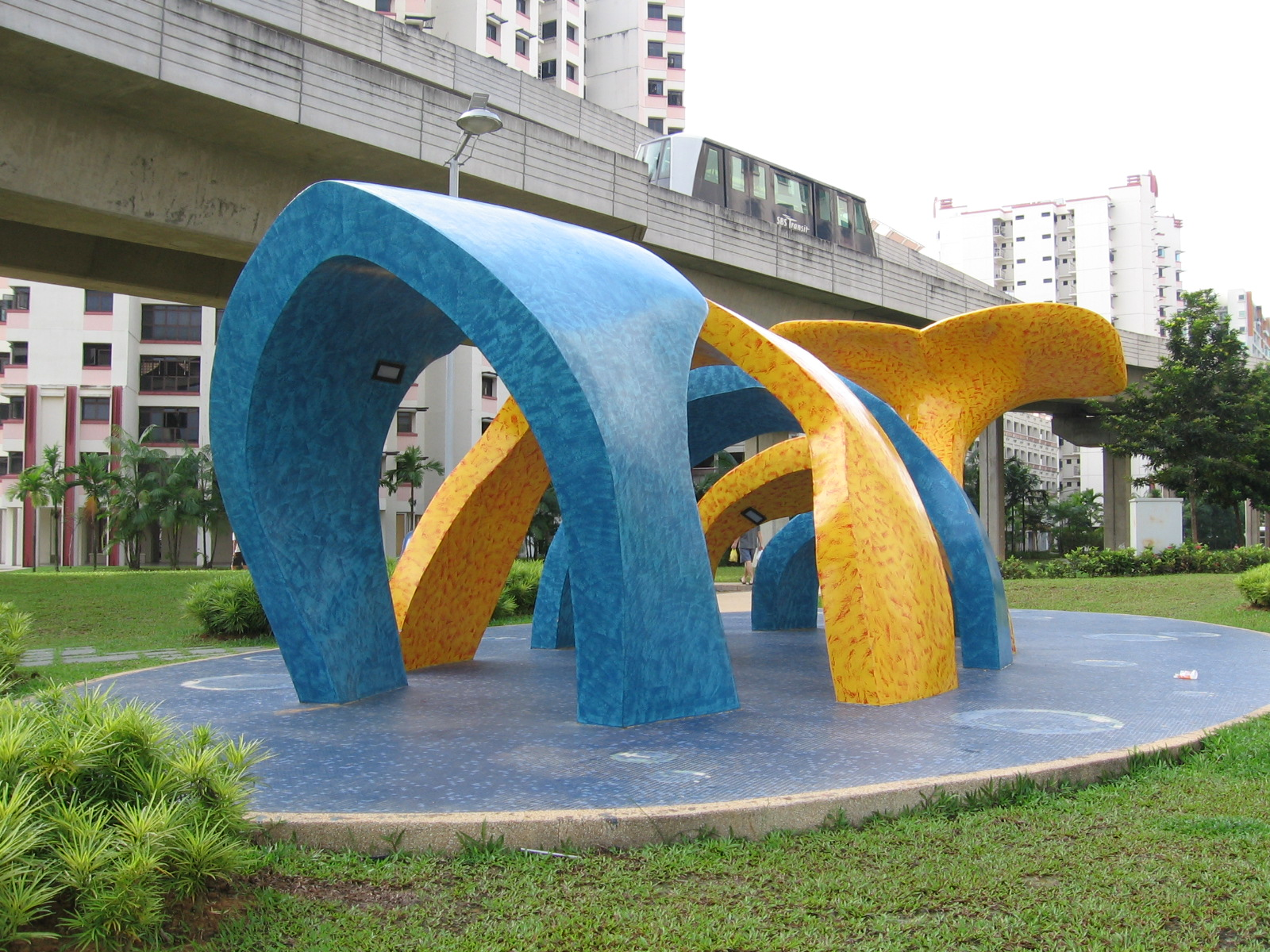

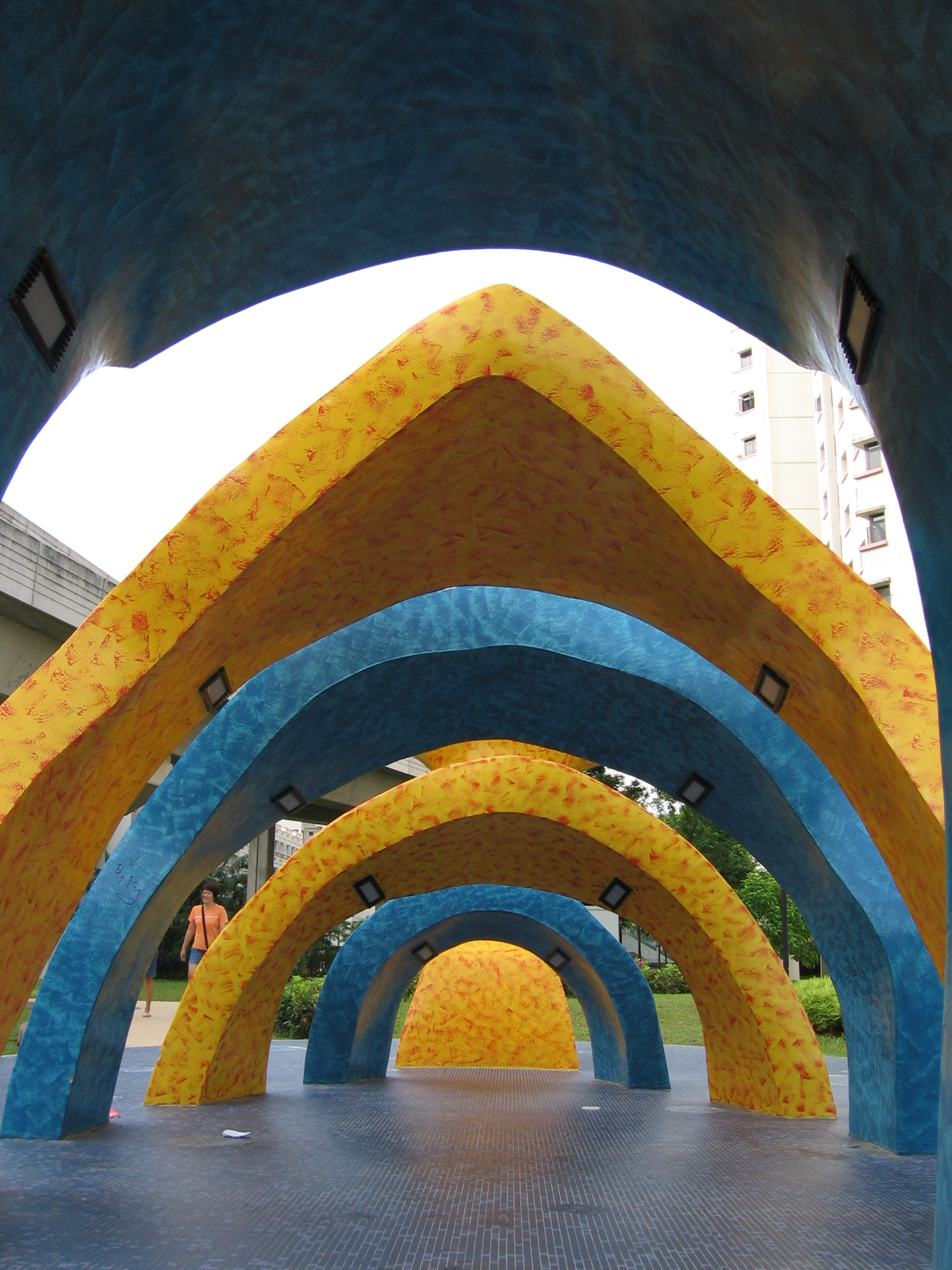

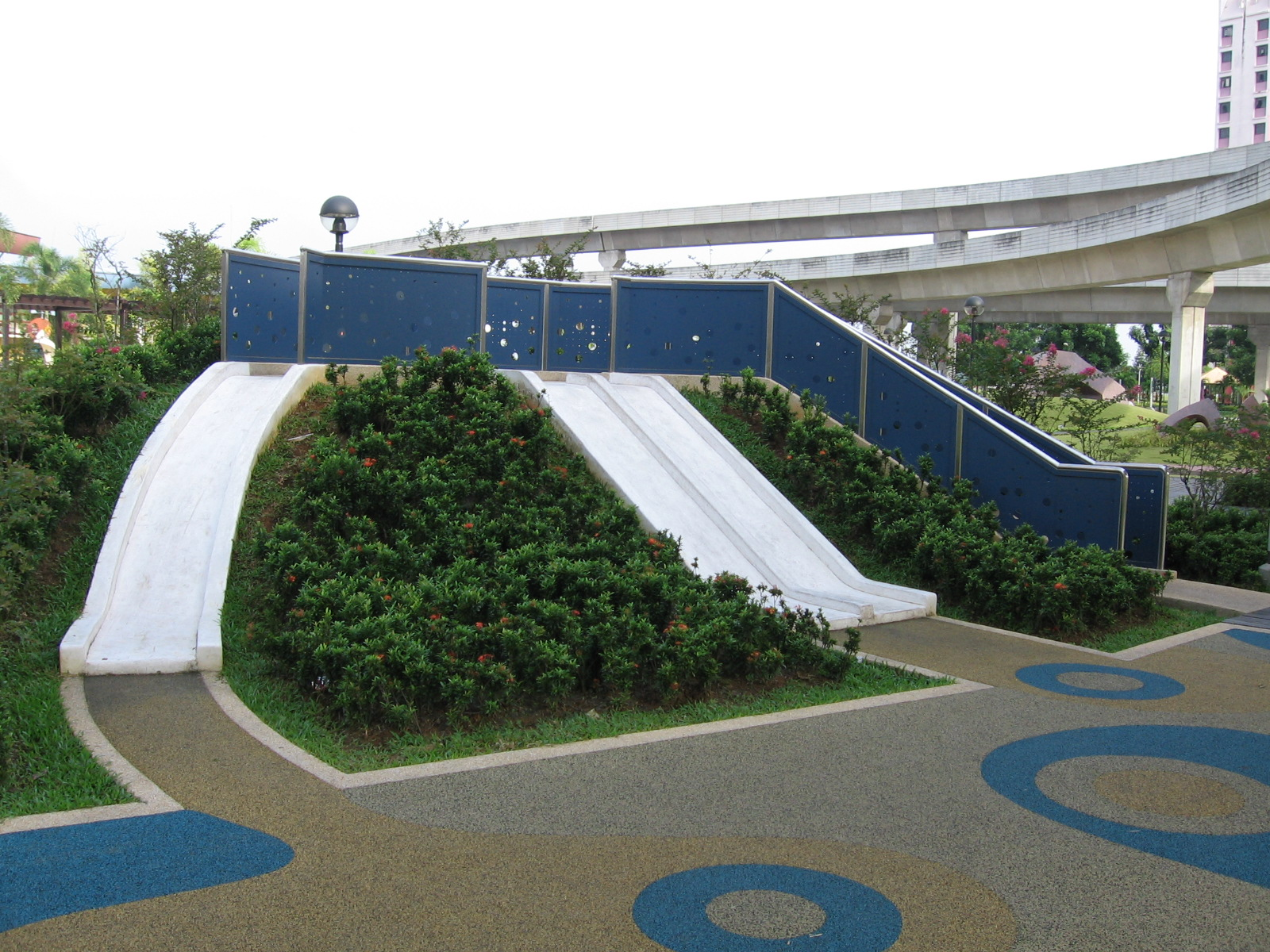

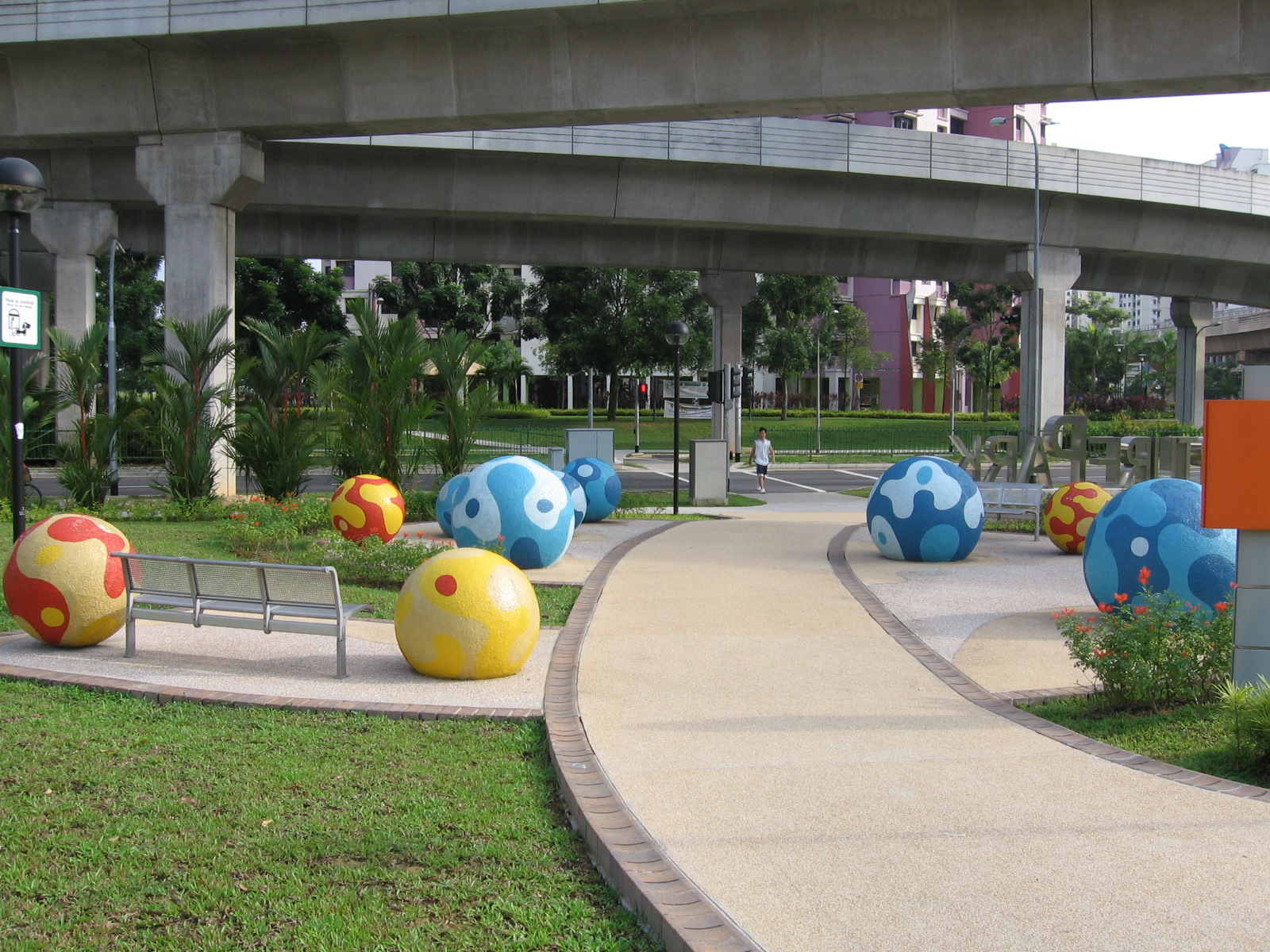

Sengkang town centre

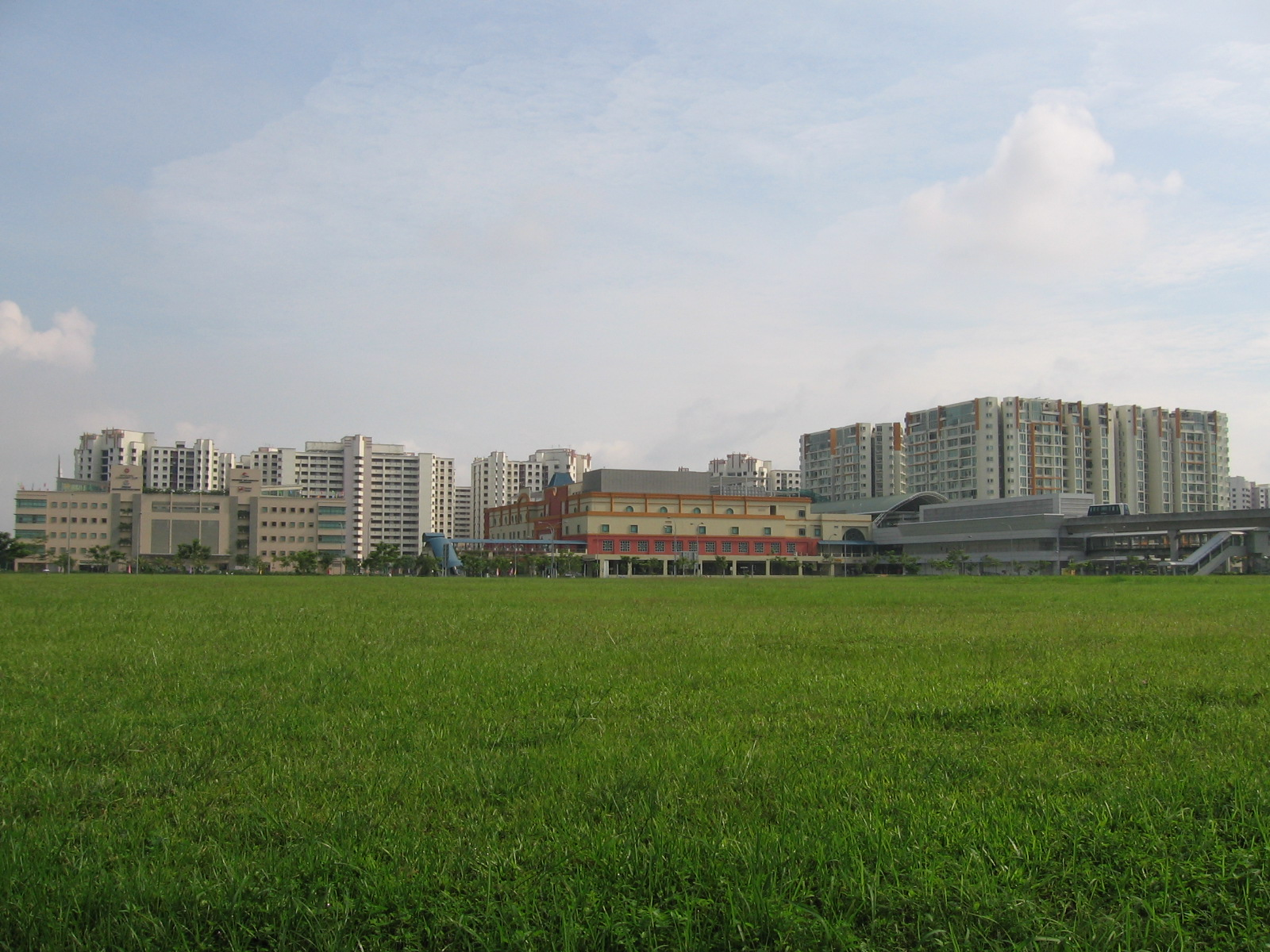
Sengkang Town Centre

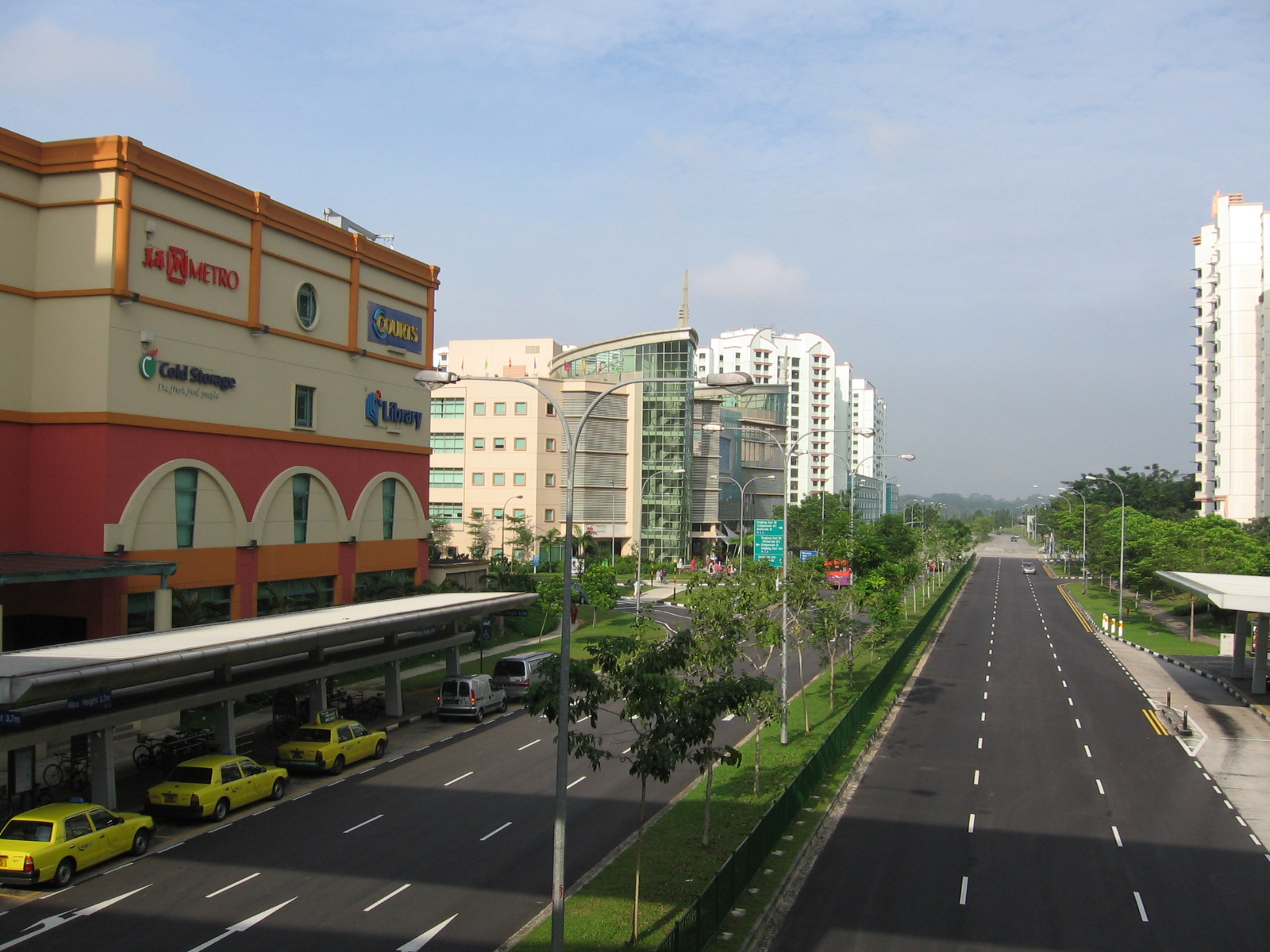
Sengkang Town Centre and Sengkang East Way

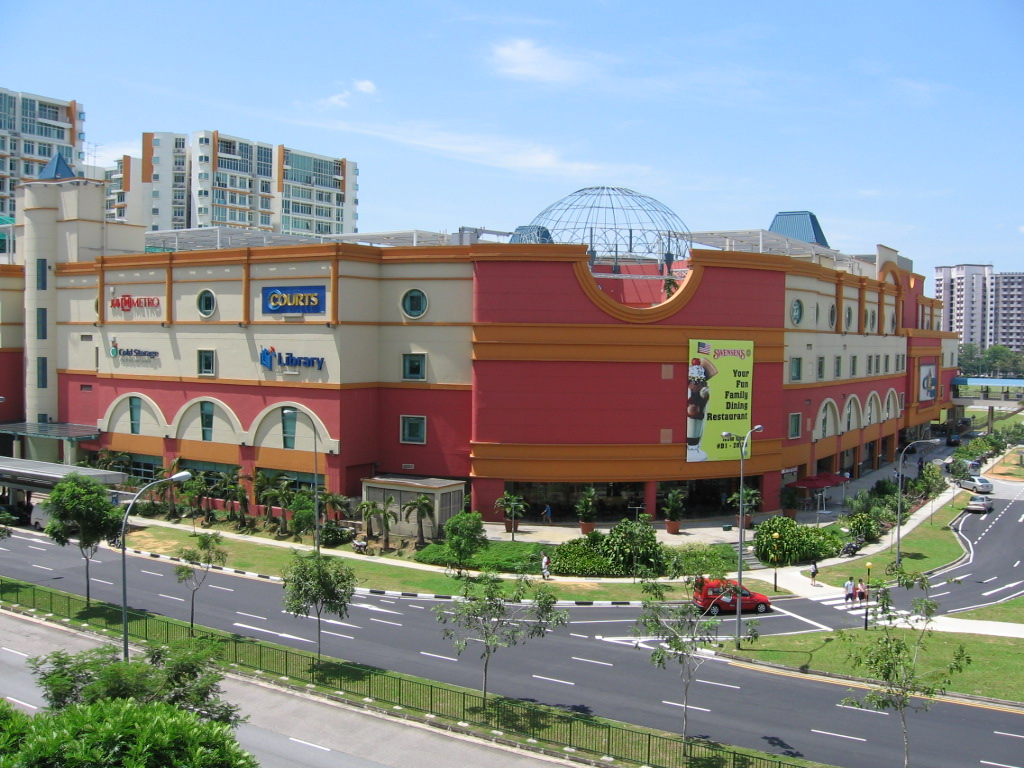
Compass One Shopping Centre

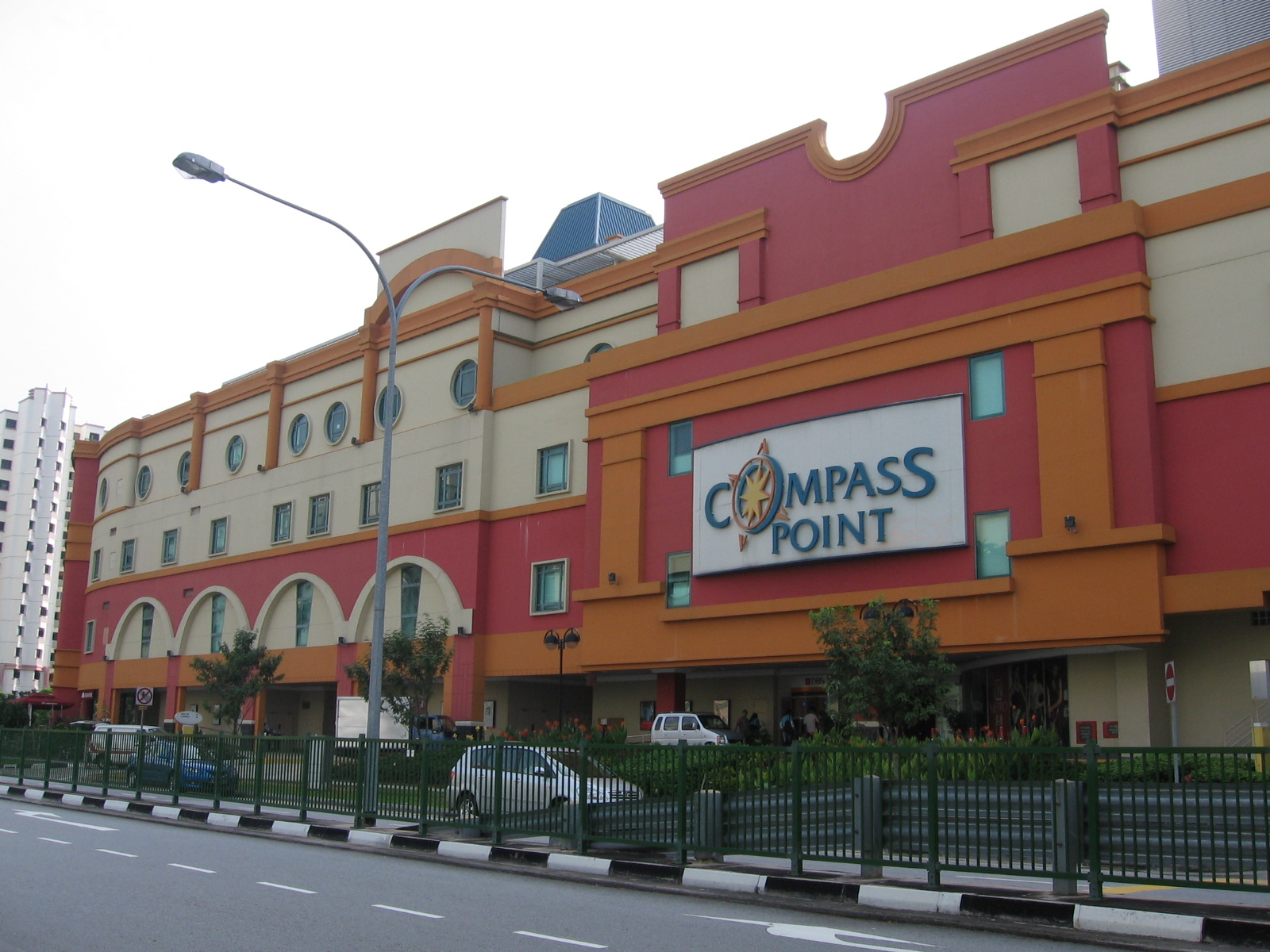
Compass One Shopping Centre

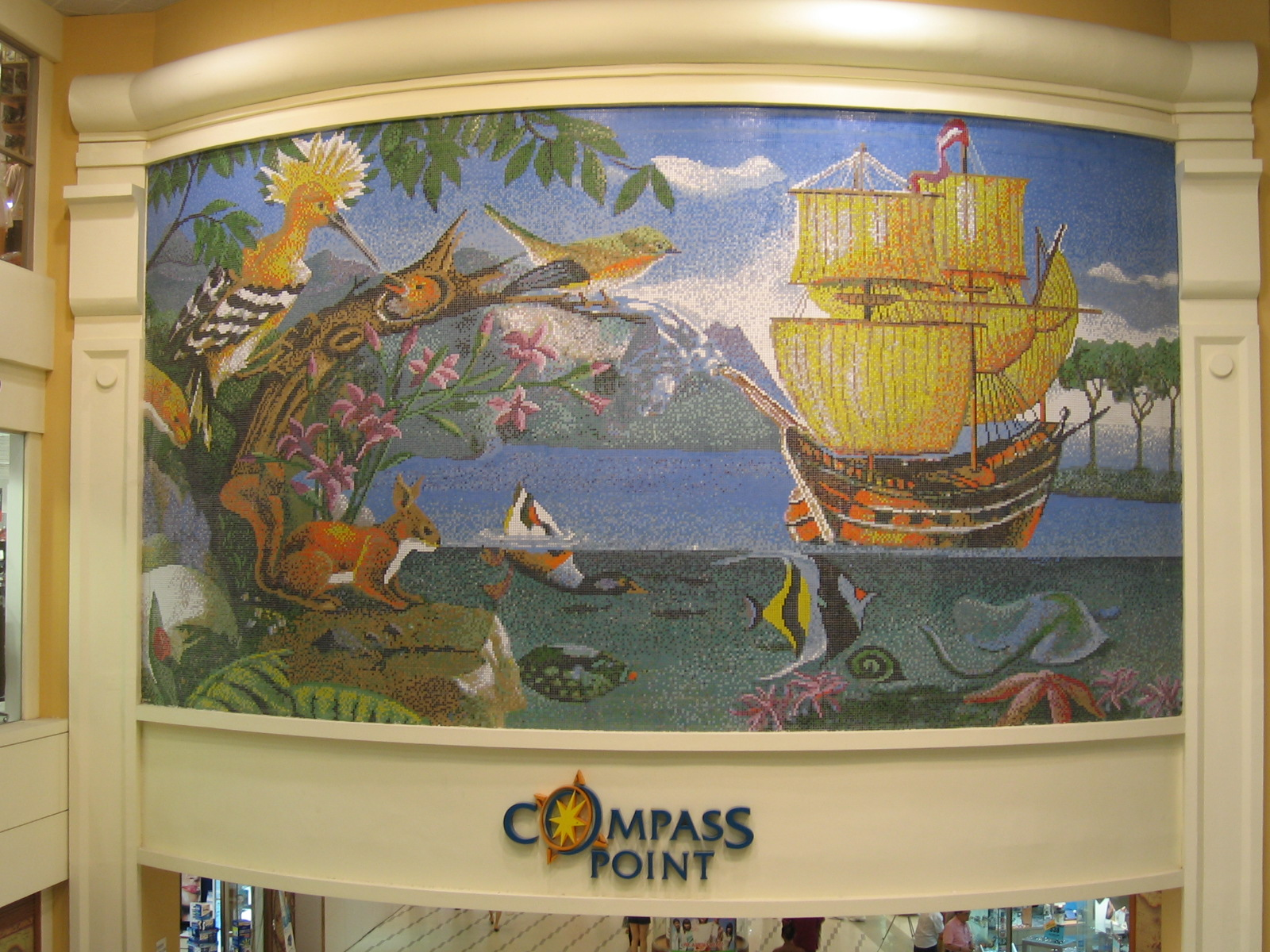
Wall tile mural at Compass One Shopping Centre

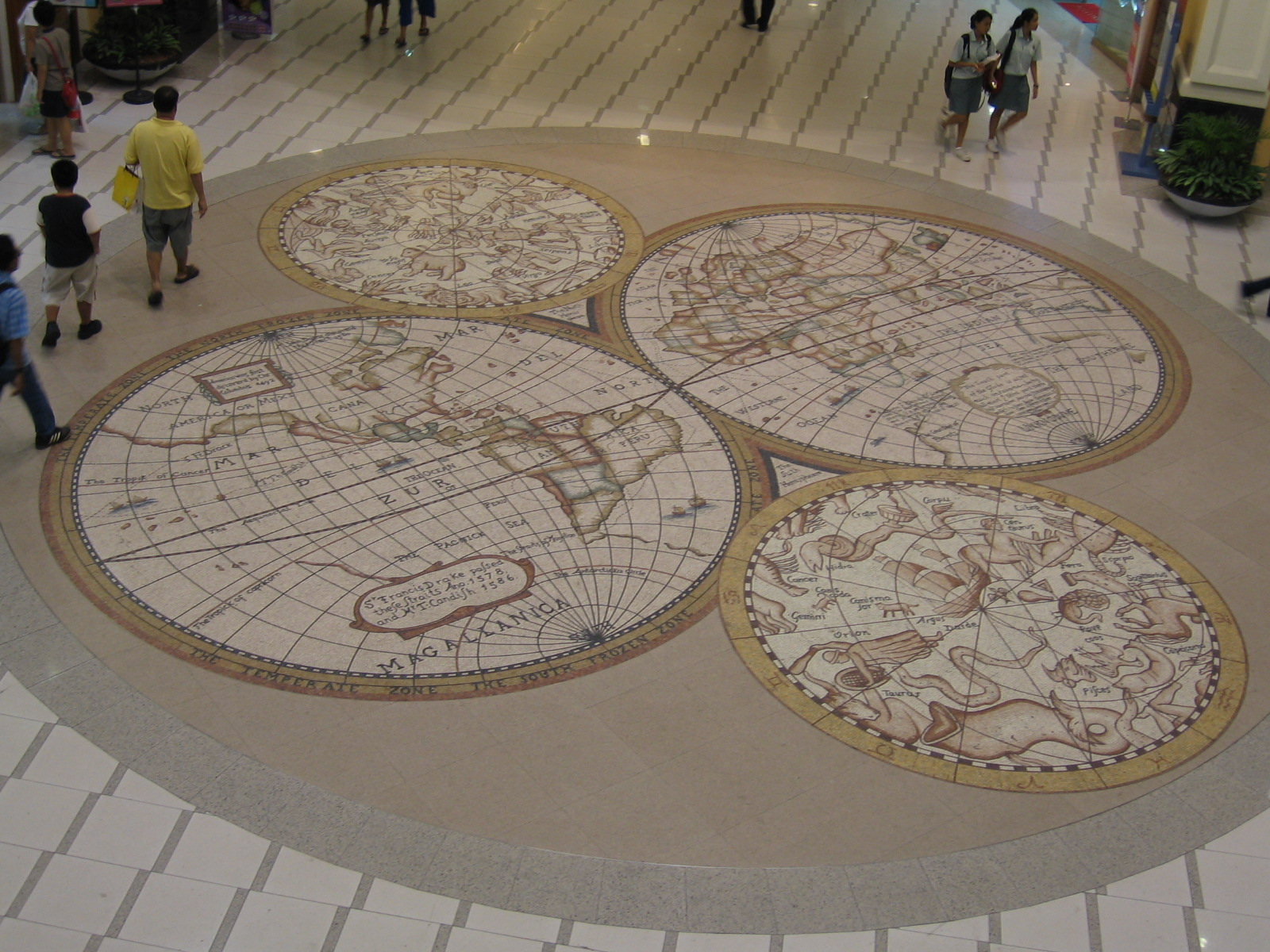
Floor tile mural at Compass One Shopping Centre

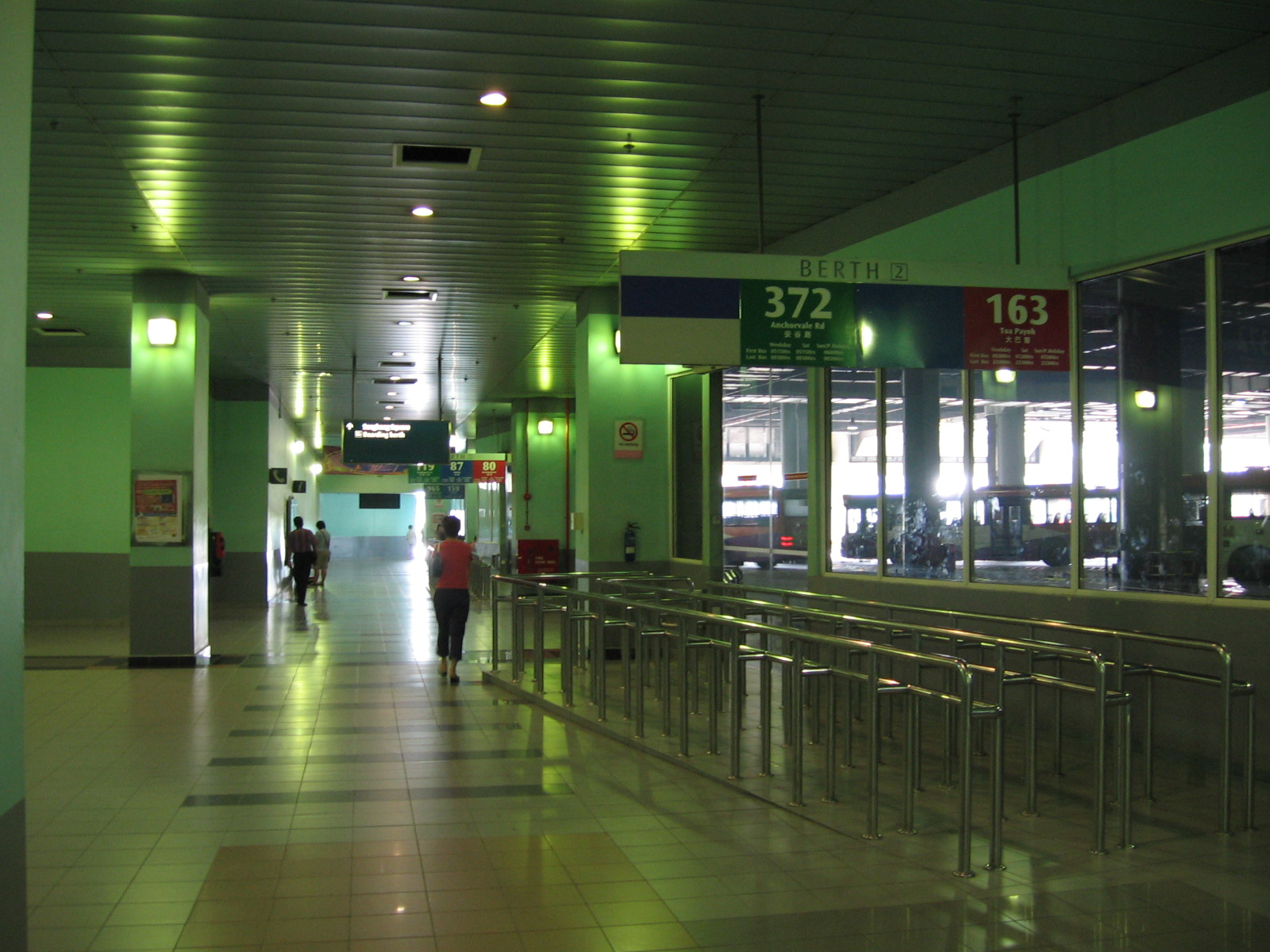
Sengkang Bus Interchange

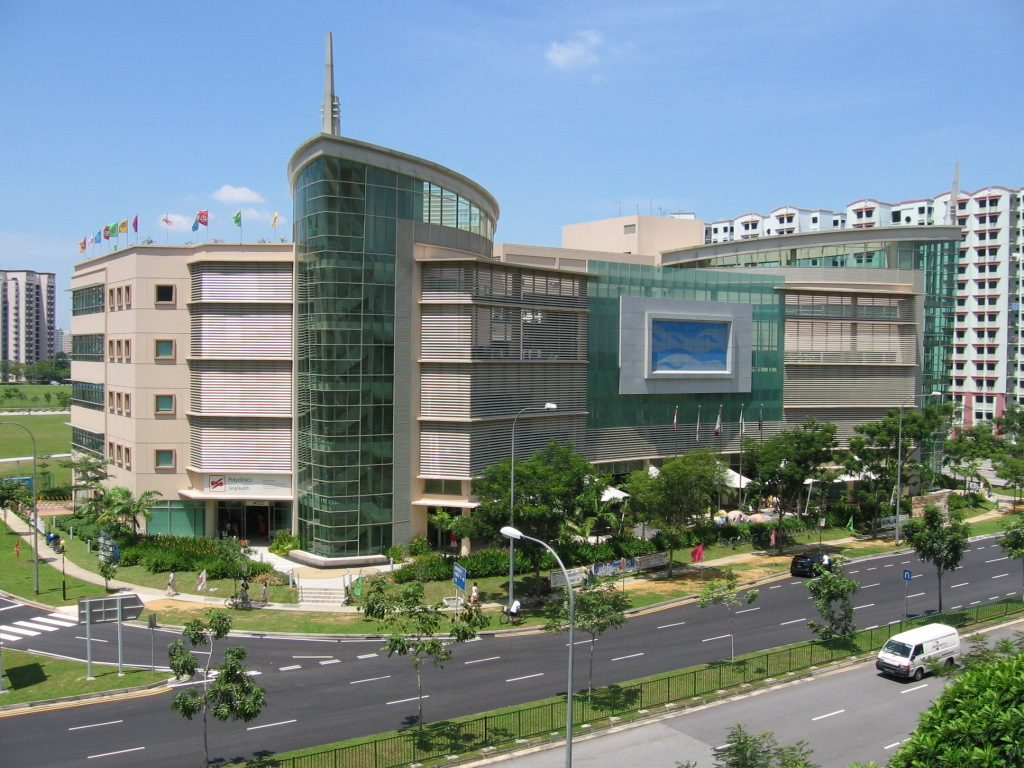
Sengkang Community Hub

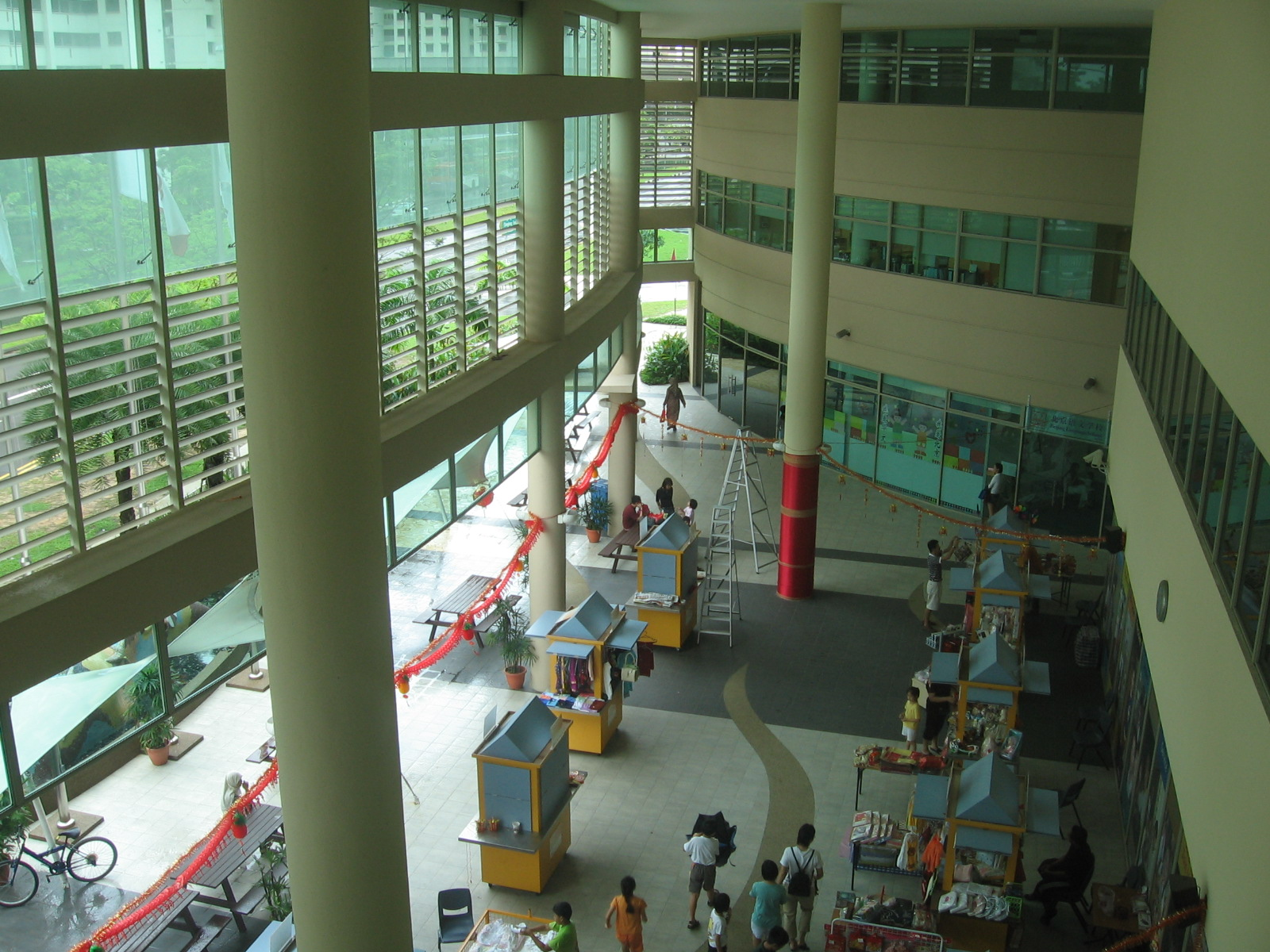
Sengkang Community Hub

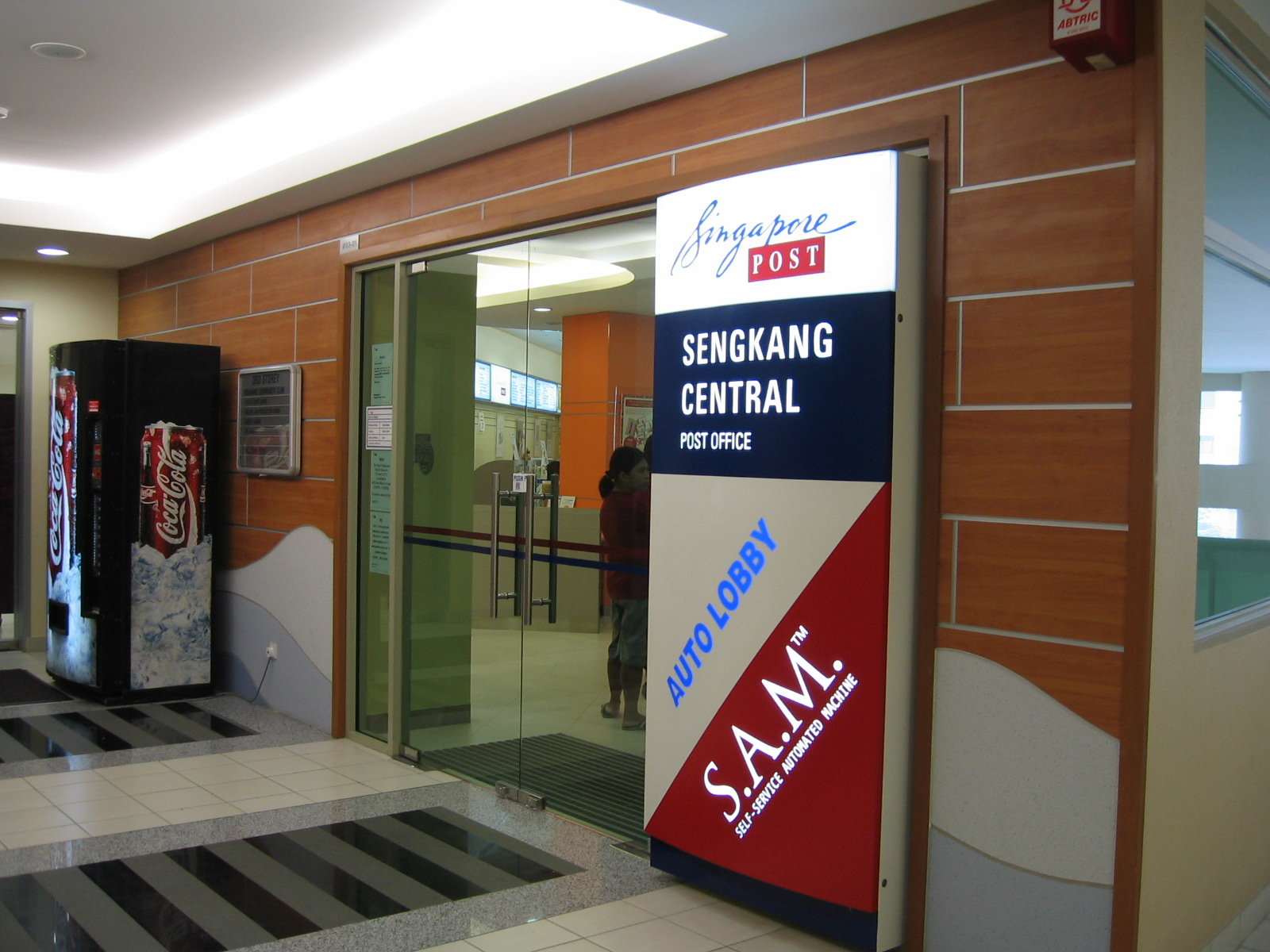
Sengkang Community Hub

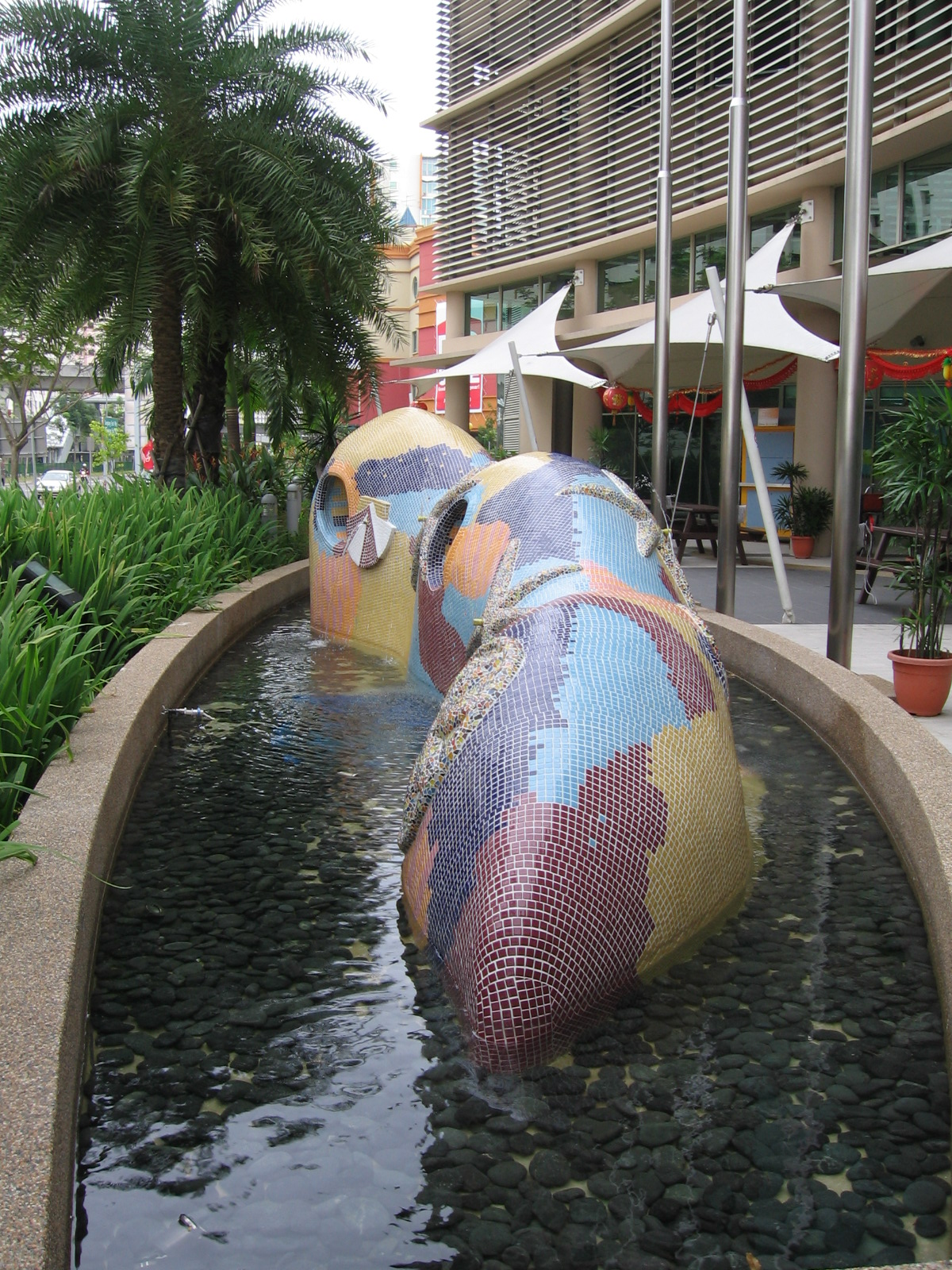
Sengkang Community Hub

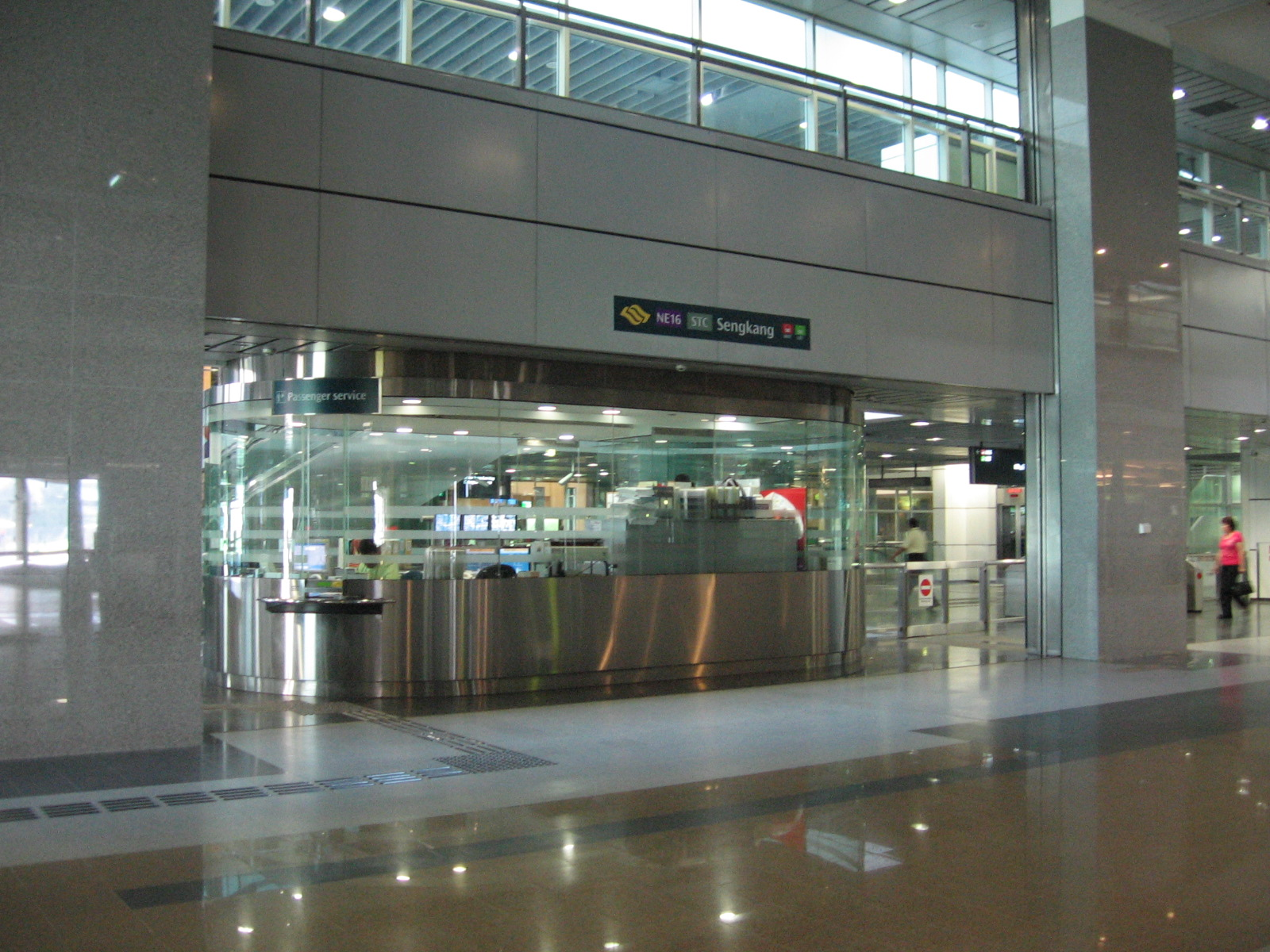
Sengkang North East Line Interchange
