= Sengkang Community Club =

Sengkang Community Hub
- 盛港社区中心
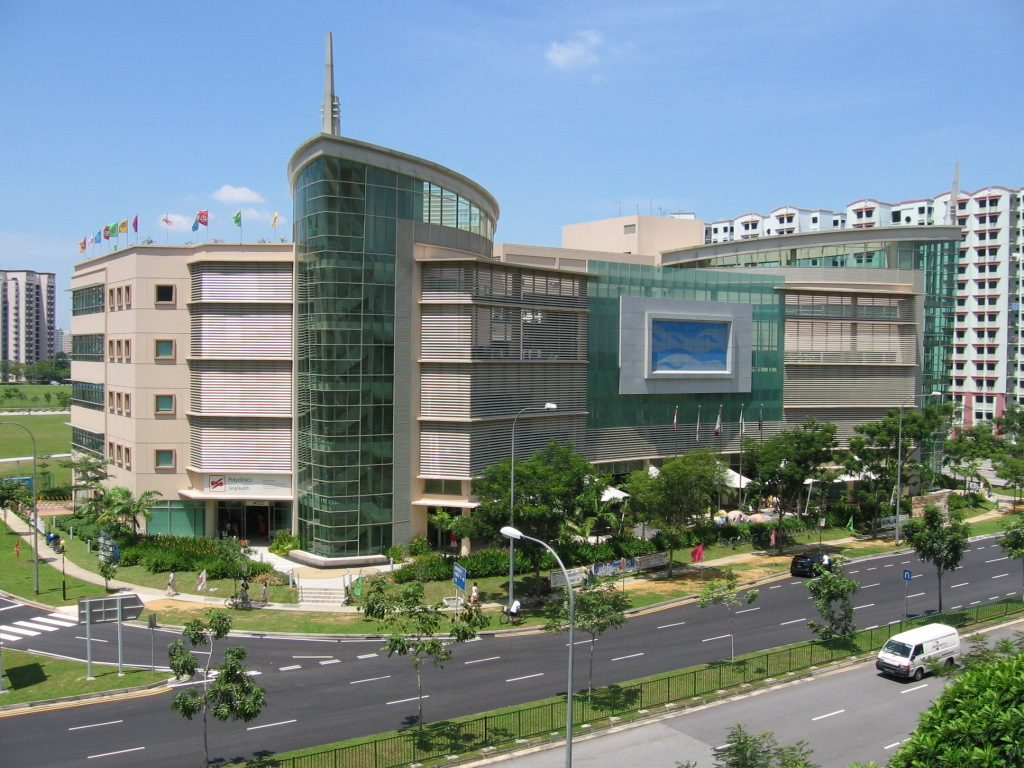
- Interactive map of the Sengkang Community Hub area

General information
- Status: Occupied
- Type: Community and Commercial
- Architectural style: Low-rise
- Location: 2 Sengkang Square, Singapore 545025
- Coordinates: 1°23′33″N 103°53′40″E

Technical details
- Floor count: 5 with a basement car park

Sengkang Community Hub (Simplified Chinese: 盛港社区中心) is an amenity centre in Sengkang, within the North-East Region of Singapore.

The amenity centre is located in the town centre of Sengkang New Town. It serves to provide a one-stop access to community, educational, health care, security and counselling services for the residents of Sengkang New Town. The building, which was completed in 2004, houses a neighbourhood police centre, a Singapore Post post office, a People's Association community club, a SingHealth polyclinic, a Kandang Kerbau Women's and Children's Hospital women's clinic, and a Singapore Anti-Narcotics Association office.

Sengkang Community Hub, and its community club and neighbourhood police centre, were officially opened by Teo Chee Hean, Minister for Defence and Member of Parliament for Pasir Ris-Punggol Group Representation Constituency, on 10 December 2005.

Sengkang Community Hub is well-served by public transport, being located near the Sengkang MRT/LRT station, the Sengkang Bus Interchange and the Compassvale Bus Interchange. It is located next to Compass One Shopping Centre.

== Facilities ==
Sengkang Community Hub currently houses the following community facilities:

- KK Women's Clinic @ Sengkang - opened in April 2005
- Sengkang Central Constituency Office
- Sengkang Polyclinic (Singhealth) - started operations on 12 January 2005
- Sengkang Neighbourhood Police Centre - opened on 4 October 2004
- Sengkang Community Club - began operations in December 2004
- Singapore Anti-Narcotics Association (SANA) - opened on 29 January 2005
- Singapore Post - opened on 7 February 2005
