= Sengkang =

Planning Area and HDB Town in the North-East Region, Singapore

- Planning Area and HDB Town

Other transcription(s)
  - Chinese: 盛港; Shènggǎng (Pinyin); Sêng-káng (Hokkien POJ); Sĕng-káng (Teochew PUJ)
  - Malay: Sengkang
  - Tamil: செங்காங் Ceṅkāṅ (Transliteration)
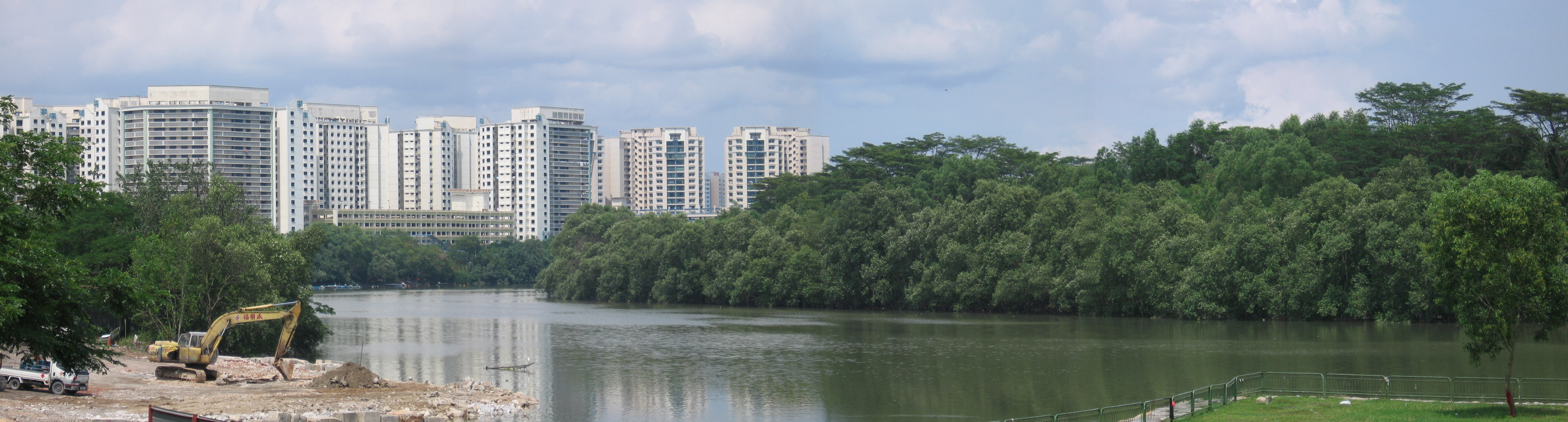
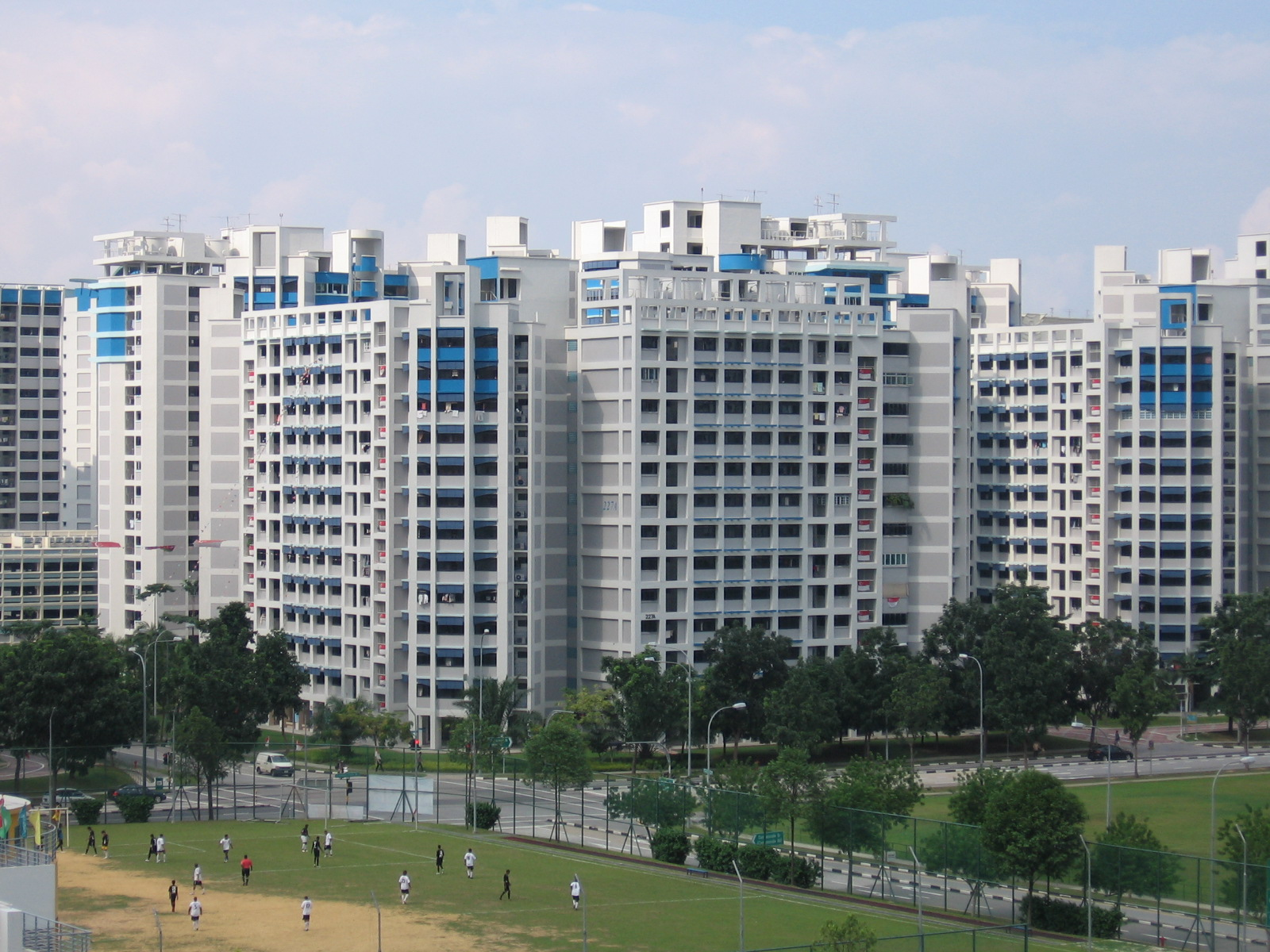
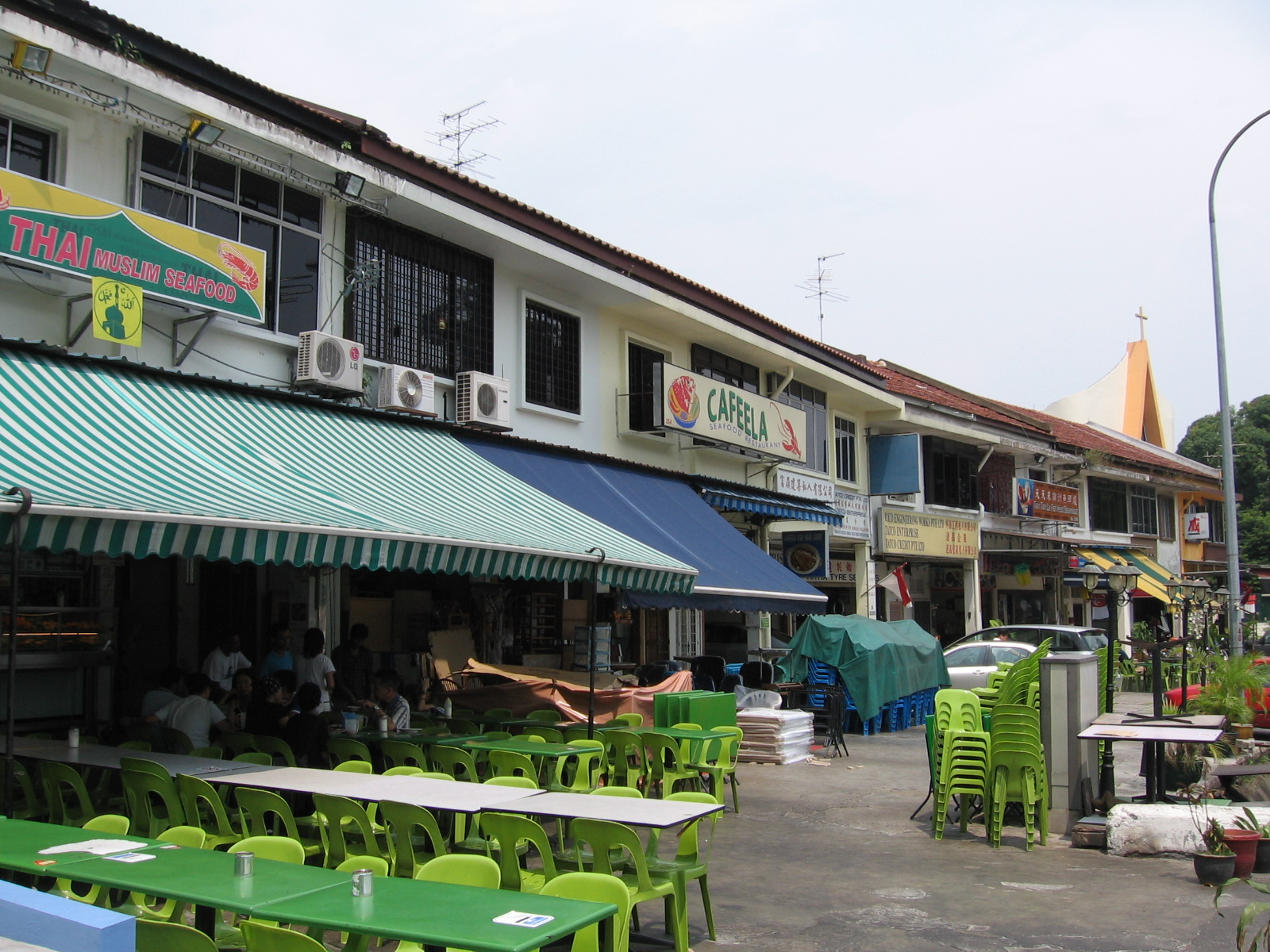
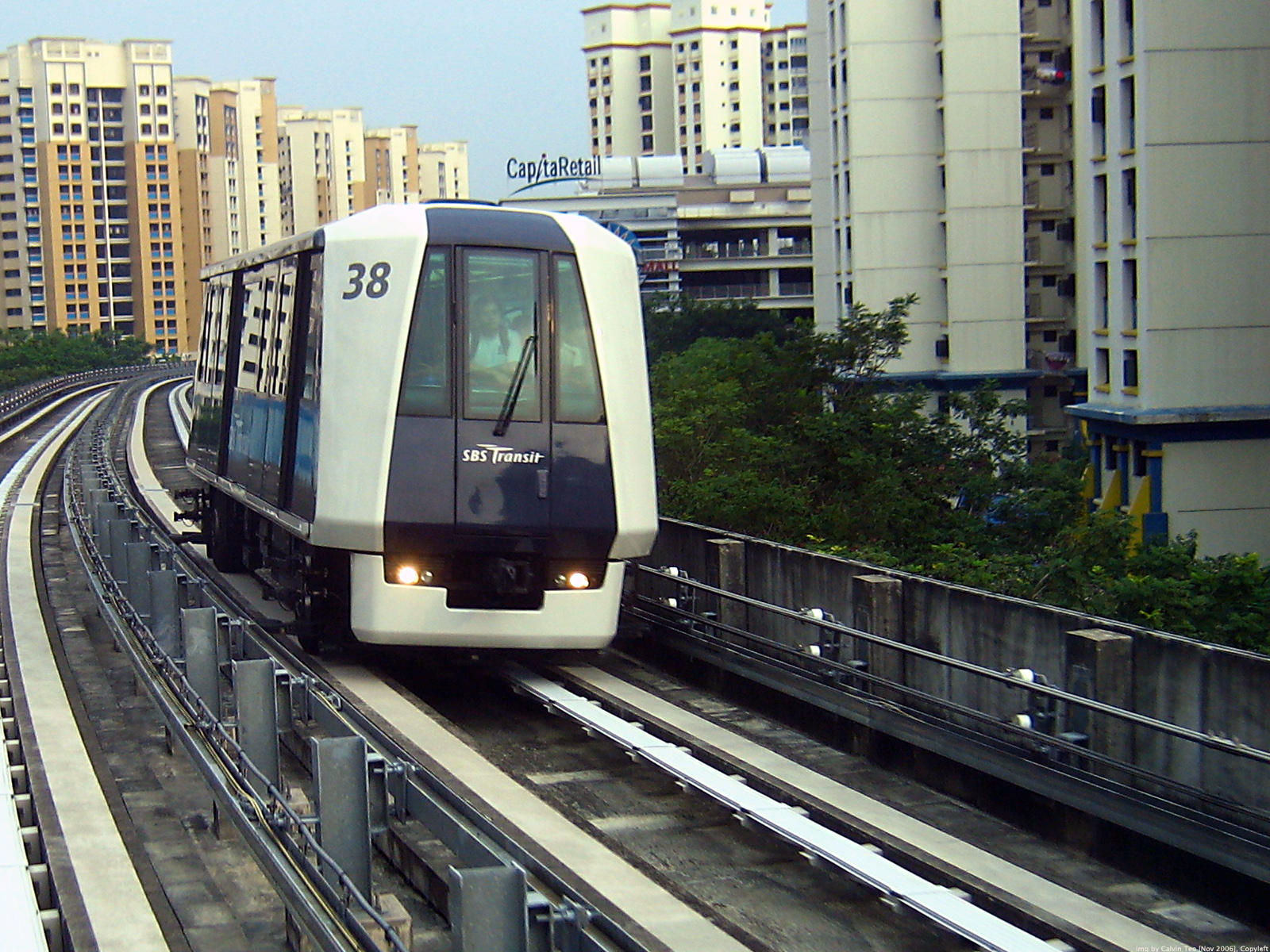
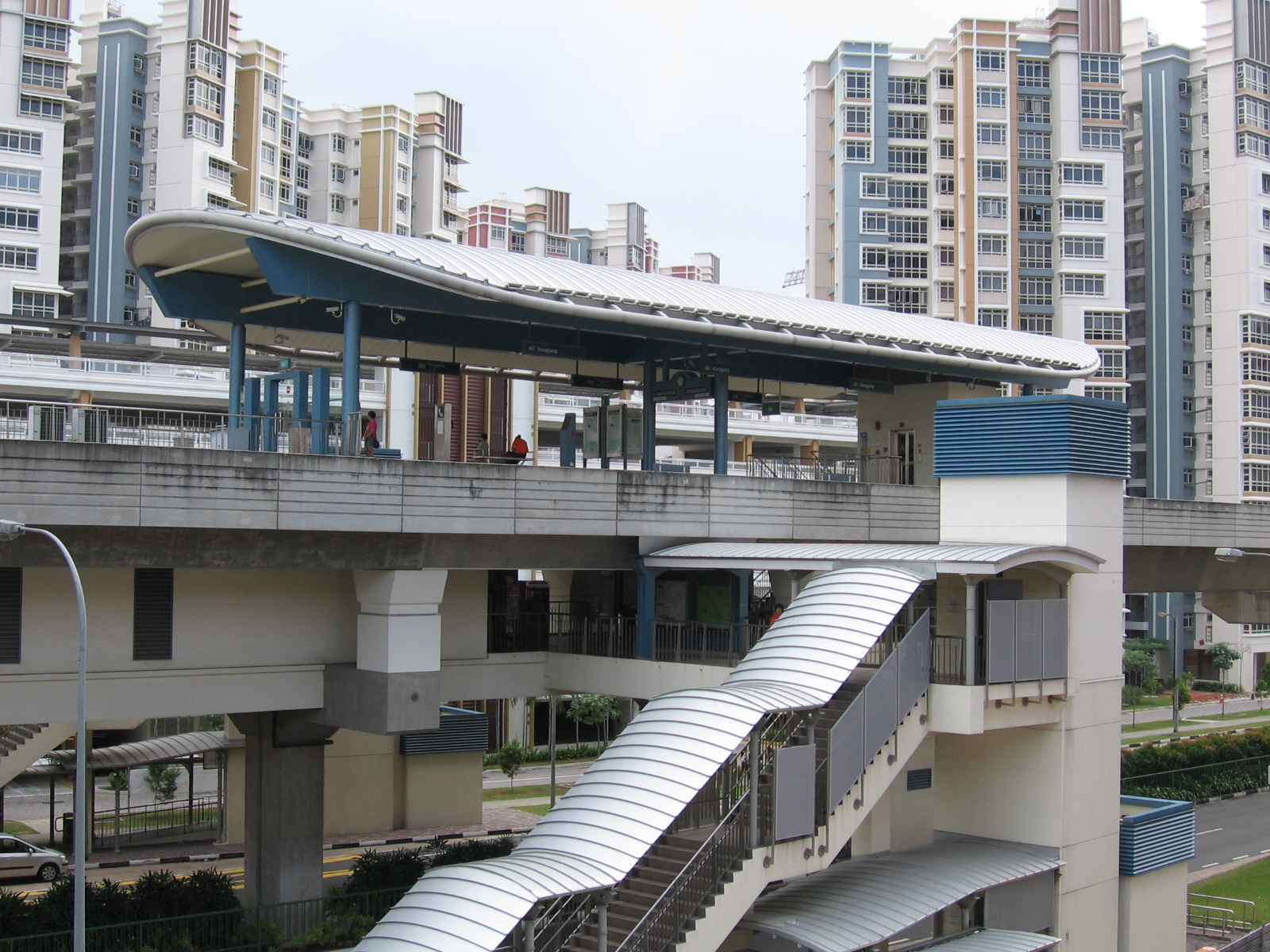
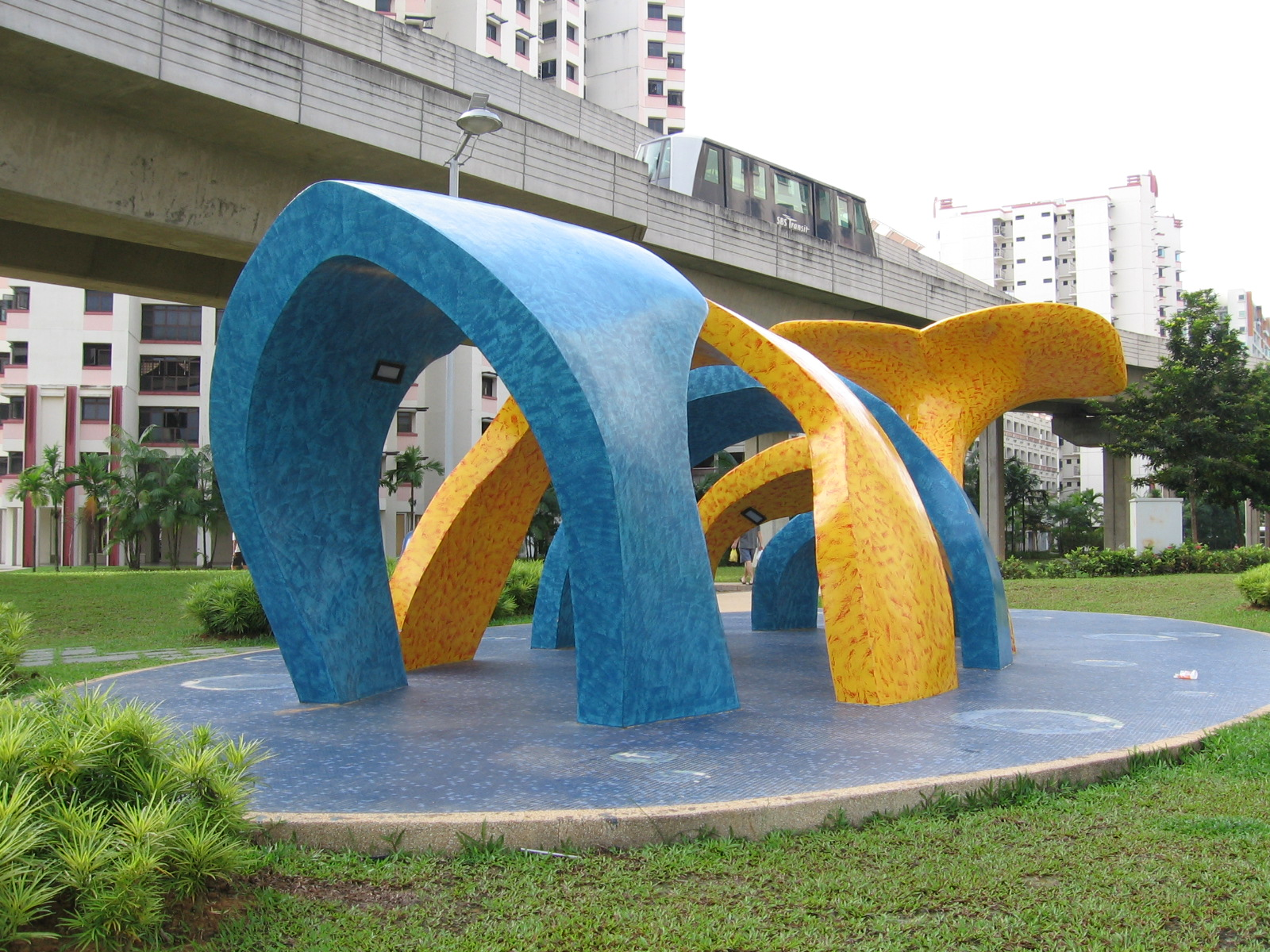
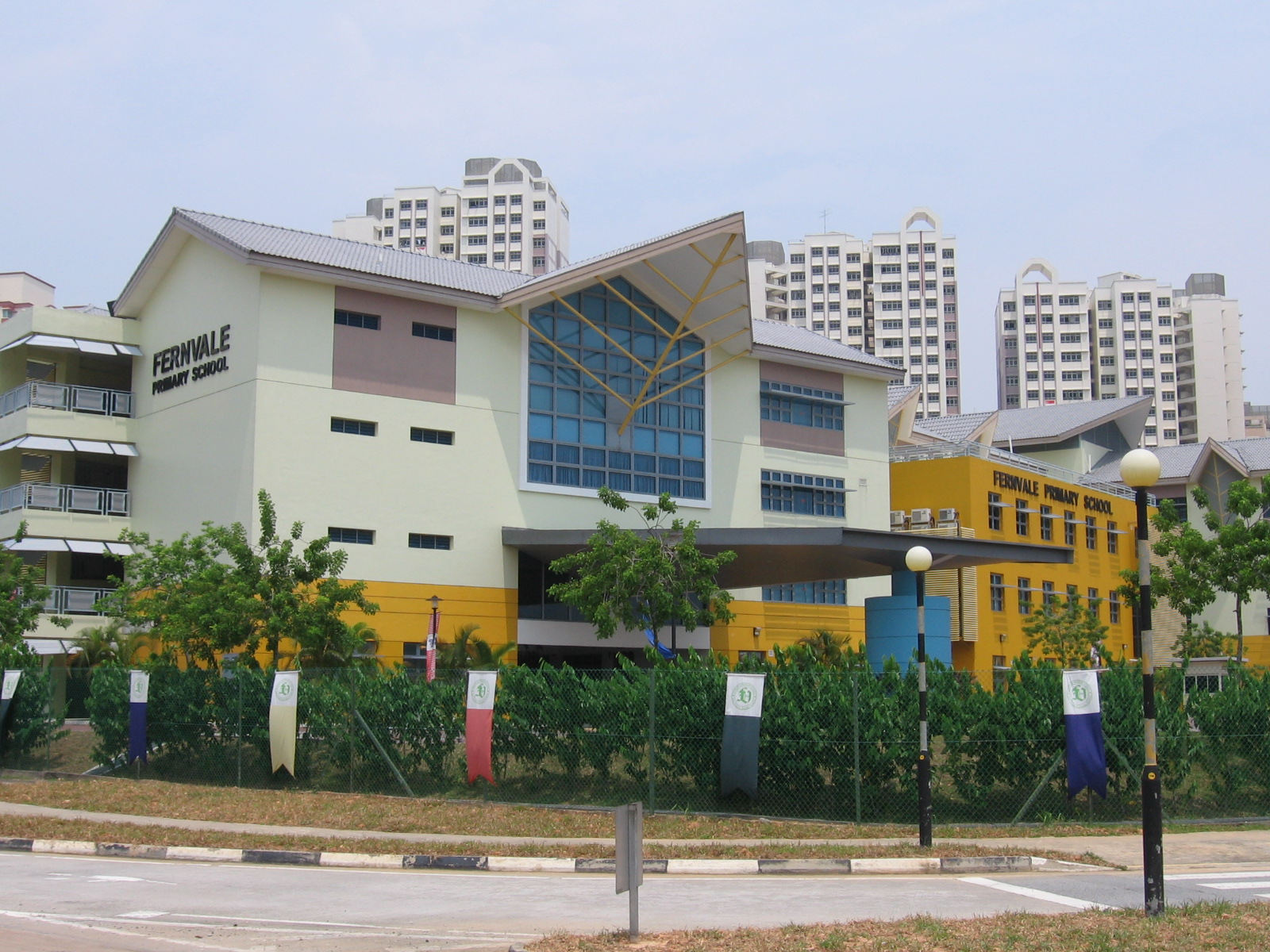
- From top; left to right: Panoramic view of Sungei Serangoon with Rivervale on the west bank, Compassvale, Jalan Kayu, Sengkang LRT Line, Ranggung LRT Station, Sengkang Sculpture Park, Fernvale Primary School

- Location of Sengkang in Singapore

- Location of Sengkang within Singapore
- Coordinates: 1°23′30″N 103°53′40″E
- Country: Singapore
- Region: North-East Region
- CDCs: Central Singapore CDC; North East CDC

Government
  - Mayors: Central Singapore CDC: Denise Phua; North East CDC: Baey Yam Keng
  - Members of Parliament: Ang Mo Kio GRC: Victor Lye; Jalan Kayu SMC: Ng Chee Meng; Sengkang GRC: Abdul Muhaimin; He Ting Ru; Jamus Lim; Louis Chua

Area
  - Total: 10.60 km^{2} (4.09 sq mi)
  - Residential: 3.97 km^{2} (1.53 sq mi)

Population (2026)
  - Total: 265,830
  - Density: 25,080/km^{2} (64,950/sq mi)

Ethnic groups (2020)
  - Chinese: 192,870
  - Malays: 28,560
  - Indians: 21,690
  - Others: 6,240
- Postal district: 19, 28
- Dwelling units: 59,497
- Projected ultimate: 92,000

Sengkang (locally /ˈseɪŋkɑːŋ/, Chinese: 盛港, Tamil: செங்காங்) is a planning area and residential town located in the North-East Region of Singapore. The town is the most populous in the region, being home to 265,830 residents as of 2026.

Originally a fishing village, Sengkang was rapidly developed by the Housing and Development Board (HDB) into a housing estate.

== Etymology ==
The name Sengkang means "prosperous harbour" in Chinese, and “to chock, block or wedge” in Malay. The name was derived from Lorong Sengkang, a former Malay kampong road, off Lorong Buangkok. Lorongs were common in the area before urban redevelopment. The area was formerly known as Kangkar (simplified Chinese: 港脚; traditional Chinese: 港腳; Pe̍h-ōe-jī: káng-kha; Pe̍h-ūe-jī: káng-kha) meaning "foot of the port" as there was once a fishing port located along Sungei Serangoon.

== History ==
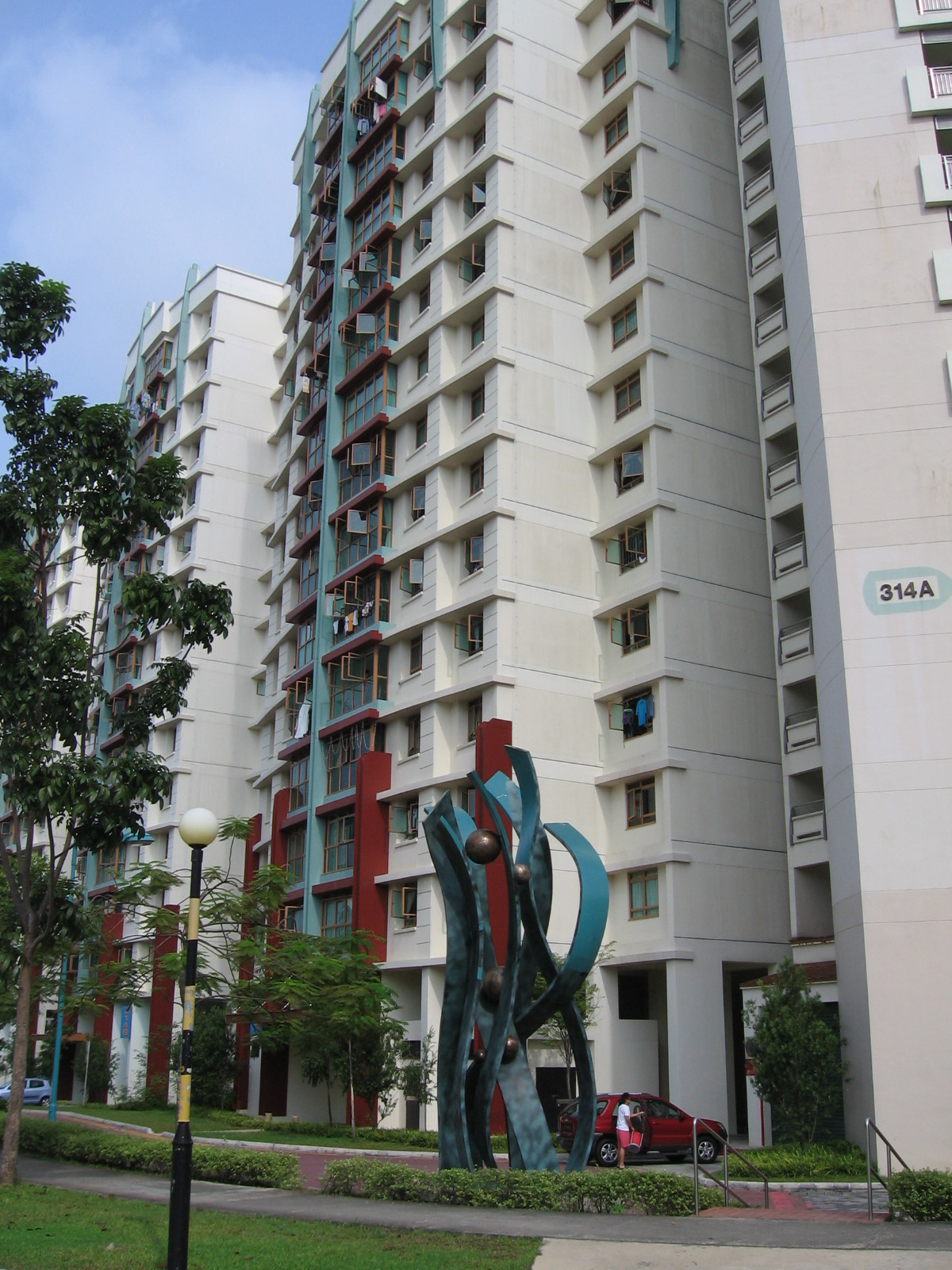
A typical apartment block in Anchorvale Gardens, showing the characteristic pilotis effect on the column façade.

Sengkang originated from the area once called Kangkar, named after the port and fishing village along Sungei Serangoon. By the mid-20th century, the area was home to several rubber, pepper, and pineapple plantations. At that time, the nearest public housing estate then was the Punggol Rural Centre located along Punggol Road. Sengkang was largely left alone until 1994, when an urban design team of ten from HDB began conceptualization for a new town in Sengkang. Sengkang was carved up into seven subzones that would house a total of 95,000 public and private housing units in the long term.

Conjured by local newspapers, Sengkang's theme became 'Town of the Seafarer', which reflects its history as a fishing village. Two sub-themes were assigned to the four neighbourhood areas (namely Rivervale, Compassvale, Anchorvale, and Fernvale) of the new town: one reflected Sengkang's marine history, while the other related to the sprawling plantations that previously covered parts of the area. The neighborhoods were each given a name and a colour scheme to go with their respective themes. The three-storey pilotis or stilt effect was also utilized in the design of housing blocks, to resemble the stilts of fishing villages and trunks of the various plantations of bygone years.

The town's first public apartments (known locally as flats per British English) at Rivervale were completed in 1997. By September 13 2001, about 33,700 dwelling units were completed. As of 31 March 2017, there are 65,981 HDB dwelling units in Sengkang.

In October 1999, a steering committee chaired by Michael Lim, then-Member of Parliament (MP) for Cheng San Group Representation Constituency (GRC), was formed to look into providing sufficient amenities in Sengkang New Town. In view of feedback from residents, it completed its report on the need for facilities and services in the new town in July 2000. They coordinated with various organizations to open more void-deck precinct shops, a new shopping mall and childcare centres.

== Geography ==
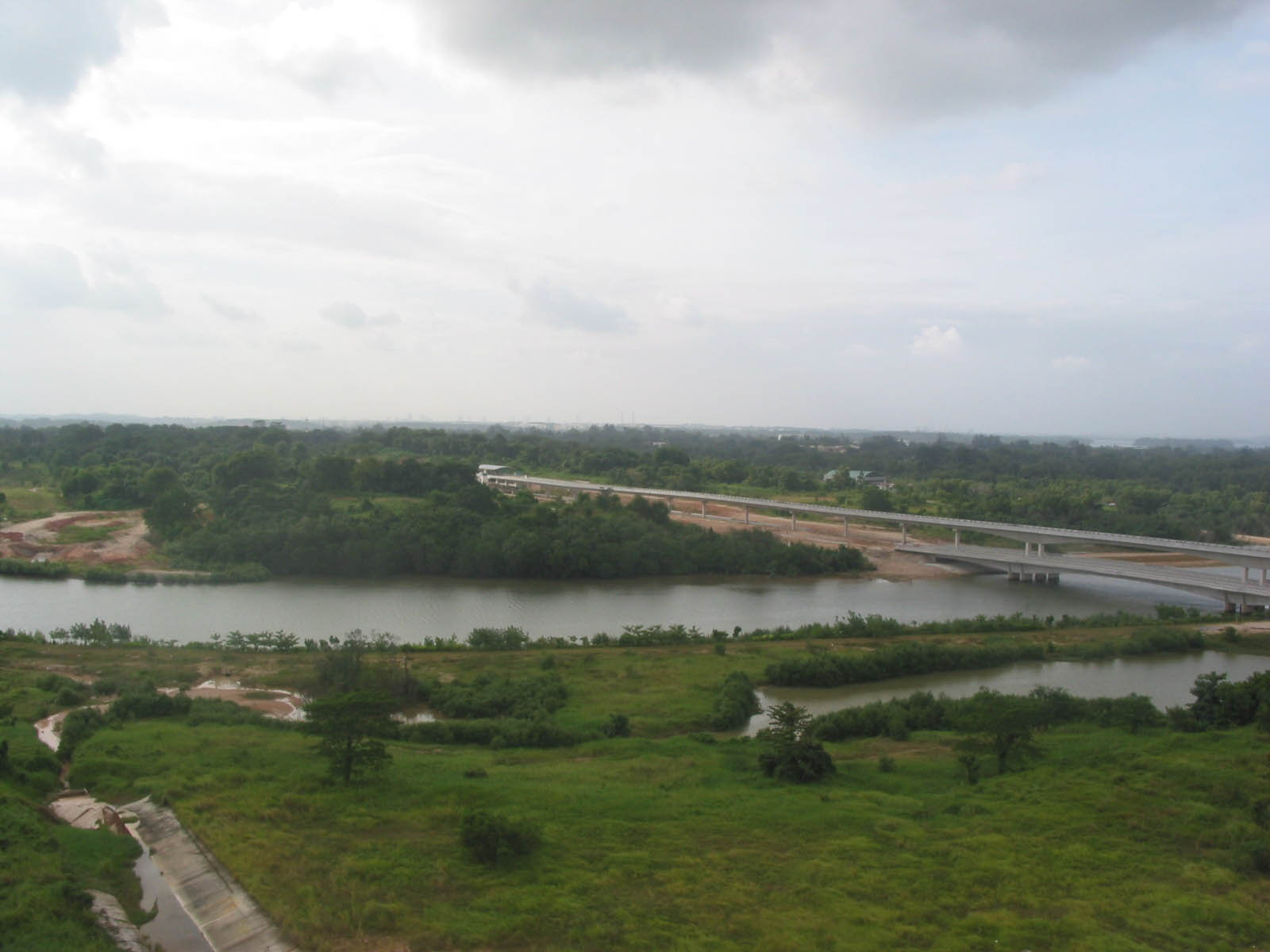
Sungei Punggol with the Sengkang Light Rail Transit Line viaduct, before HDB flats were built.

Sengkang is a primarily residential town situated to the north of Hougang New Town in the north-eastern part of Singapore, under the North-East Region as defined by the Urban Redevelopment Authority (URA).

The town is bordered to the north by the Tampines Expressway (TPE), to the east by the Kallang–Paya Lebar Expressway (KPE), Yio Chu Kang Road and Buangkok Drive to the south and the Seletar Expressway (CTE) to the west. Sungei Punggol (Punggol River) and Sungei Serangoon (Serangoon River) bothg cut through the new town. Sengkang Town Centre is located in Compassvale. As of 2015, a new industrial area, Sengkang West Industrial Area, is planned for the area.

The construction of Sengkang West Road, which begins where Yio Chu Kang Road and Jalan Kayu intersect, started in 2011 and the first section was opened to traffic on 13 October 2013. The remaining section of the road opened on 16 May 2015. The road passes through the extended roads of Fernvale Lane, Sengkang West Avenue, Sengkang West Way in front of the Fernvale neighbourhood, cuts through the TPE across the Seletar Aerospace Flyover and links to Seletar Aerospace Park. An extension of Sengkang West Way to Sengkang West Road opened on 14 May 2017.

=== Subzones ===
Sengkang New Town is divided into the following seven subzones.

- Rivervale
- Compassvale
- Anchorvale
- Fernvale
- Sengkang Town Centre
- Sengkang West
- Lorong Halus North

== Demographics ==
As of June 2026, the most populous subzone in Sengkang is Fernvale with 71,050 residents, closely followed by Rivervale with 62,090 residents. In contrast, subzones such as Sengkang West and Lorong Halus North are completely unpopulated.

=== Population history ===
Resident population history
| Year | Pop. | ±% p.a. |
|---|---|---|
| 2000 | 61,300 | — |
| 2005 | 130,330 | +16.28% |
| 2010 | 167,050 | +5.09% |
| 2015 | 206,680 | +4.35% |
| 2020 | 249,370 | +3.83% |
| 2025 | 267,600 | +1.42% |
| 2026 | 265,830 | −0.66% |

=== Age profile ===
The data below is from the population report published by the Singapore Department of Statistics as of June 2026.

| Age group (years) | Males | Females | Total population | % of total population |
|---|---|---|---|---|
| 0–4 | 5,880 | 5,670 | 11,550 | 4.34 |
| 5–9 | 7,730 | 7,150 | 14,880 | 5.60 |
| 10–14 | 8,630 | 8,230 | 16,860 | 6.34 |
| 15–19 | 8,040 | 7,510 | 15,550 | 5.85 |
| 20–24 | 7,000 | 6,810 | 13,810 | 5.20 |
| 25–29 | 7,590 | 7,620 | 15,210 | 5.72 |
| 30–34 | 9,150 | 10,130 | 19,280 | 7.25 |
| 35–39 | 10,550 | 12,200 | 22,750 | 8.56 |
| 40–44 | 11,220 | 12,660 | 23,880 | 8.98 |
| 45–49 | 10,740 | 11,710 | 22,450 | 8.45 |
| 50–54 | 10,130 | 10,410 | 20,540 | 7.73 |
| 55–59 | 8,320 | 8,170 | 16,490 | 6.20 |
| 60–64 | 7,670 | 7,690 | 15,360 | 5.78 |
| 65–69 | 6,840 | 7,220 | 14,060 | 5.29 |
| 70–74 | 5,060 | 5,480 | 10,540 | 3.96 |
| 75–79 | 3,260 | 3,770 | 7,030 | 2.64 |
| 80–84 | 1,280 | 1,690 | 2,970 | 1.12 |
| 85–89 | 700 | 1,060 | 1,760 | 0.66 |
| 90+ | 230 | 640 | 870 | 0.33 |

| Age group (years) | Males | Females | Total population | % of total population |
|---|---|---|---|---|
| 0–14 | 22,240 | 21,050 | 43,290 | 16.3 |
| 15–64 | 90,410 | 94,910 | 185,320 | 69.7 |
| 65+ | 17,370 | 19,860 | 37,230 | 14.0 |

Population pyramid of Sengkang in 2025

The population distribution of Sengkang in 2026 demonstrates a mature population structure. There is a higher population concentration among younger and middle-aged and groups, with males and females both peaking at the 40-44 age range at 4.22% and 4.76% respectively.

Notably, Sengkang has a relatively low proportion of elderly residents. In 2026, the proportion of residents above 65 years old was 14.0%, lower than the national proportion of 19.5%.

=== Household ===
Resident population by dwelling type in Sengkang (2000−2026)
| Year | HDB flats | | Condominiums and other apartments | | Landed properties | |
| Year | Pop. | Percentage | Pop. | Percentage | Pop. | Percentage |
|---|---|---|---|---|---|---|
| 2000 | 59,360 | 96.8% | 110 | 0.2% | 1,290 | 2.1% |
| 2005 | 123,040 | 94.4% | 5,530 | 4.2% | 1,430 | 1.1% |
| 2010 | 156,860 | 93.9% | 8,120 | 4.9% | 1,580 | 0.9% |
| 2015 | 193,280 | 93.4% | 11,340 | 5.5% | 1,570 | 0.8% |
| 2020 | 215,280 | 86.3% | 31,780 | 12.7% | 1,530 | 0.6% |
| 2025 | 223,940 | 83.7% | 41,400 | 15.5% | 1,540 | 0.6% |
| 2026 | 222,130 | 83.6% | 41,460 | 15.6% | 1,530 | 0.6% |

As of 2026, the proportion of residents residing in HDB flats (83.6%) is higher than the national proportion of HDB dwellers (75.5%), reflecting a greater prevalence of public housing in the area.

99,830 residents, or 37.6% of the population, live in 4-Room Flats, making it the most common type of dwelling.

As of 2025, the average household size in Sengkang is approximately 3.16. Among the 95,900 households in Sengkang, the most common household size is three persons, representing 23.0% of total households. This is closely followed by a household size of four persons, representing 22.9% of all households.

Sengkang has a home ownership rate of 95.5% as of 2025. This is higher than the national home ownership rate of 91.2%, reflecting a greater prevalence of homeowners in Sengkang.

=== Ethnicity ===
Ethnic groups in Sengkang (2000−2025)
| Year | Chinese | | Malays | | Indians | | Others | |
| Year | Pop. | Percentage | Pop. | Percentage | Pop. | Percentage | Pop. | Percentage |
|---|---|---|---|---|---|---|---|---|
| 2000 | 49,678 | 81% | 7,587 | 12.4% | 3,491 | 5.7% | 544 | 0.9% |
| 2010 | 131,925 | 79% | 17,087 | 10.2% | 13,849 | 8.3% | 4,193 | 2.5% |
| 2015 | 160,590 | 77.7% | 22,580 | 10.9% | 18,200 | 8.8% | 5,310 | 2.6% |
| 2020 | 192,870 | 77.3% | 28,560 | 11.5% | 21,690 | 8.7% | 6,240 | 2.5% |
| 2025 | 205,690 | 76.9% | 30,390 | 11.4% | 24,050 | 9% | 7,470 | 2.8% |

As of 2025, Sengkang has a slightly lower level of ethnic diversity compared to the national average. This is due to the larger proportion of Chinese residents (76.9%) compared to the national average of 73.9%, although this proportion has gradually declined over the years.

=== Religion ===
Religious affiliation in Sengkang (2025 est.)
1. Buddhism (35.5%)
2. No religion (23.3%)
3. Christianity (14.8%)
4. Islam (12.8%)
5. Taoism (7.10%)
6. Hinduism (6.40%)
7. Sikhism (0.20%)

Consistent with the rest of Singapore, the largest religion in Sengkang is Buddhism, with 84,600 practising residents (35.52% of the population). The second most common group consists of residents with no religion (55,400 residents, 23.26% of the population). Islam is also prominent in Sengkang, with 30,400 Muslims (12.76%). Christianity is practised by 35,200 residents (14.78%), with 18,400 Catholics (7.72%). Other religious affiliations include Taoism (16,900 residents, 7.09%), Hinduism (15,200 residents, 6.38%), and Sikhism (500 residents, 0.21%).

=== Language ===
Languages most frequently spoken at home, Sengkang (2025 est.)
| Languages | percent |
| English | 59.7% |
| Mandarin Chinese | 27.2% |
| Malay | 5.5% |
| Non-Mandarin varieties | 4.1% |
| Tamil | 1.67% |
| Other Indian languages | 1.39% |
| Others | 0.40% |

In 2025, the proportion of Malay speakers in Sengkang (5.5%), is lower than the national average of 7.0%. Additionally, 54.5% of all Indian language speakers are Tamil speakers (4,200 residents), considerably lower than the national average of 78.2%. This makes Sengkang the planning area with the third-lowest proportion of Tamil speakers among Indian language speakers in Singapore.

=== Education ===
As of 2025, 98.8% of the population aged above 15 is literate.

73.8% of residents are literate in two languages, with the most common language pair being English and Chinese (55.4%). 5.3% of Sengkang residents are literate in three or more languages.

Highest qualification attained of non-student resident population aged 15 years and over (2025 est.)
| Qualification | Percentage | Singapore average |
|---|---|---|
| Below secondary | 16.9% | 19.9% |
| Secondary | 15.1% | 14.6% |
| Post-secondary (non-tertiary) | 10.2% | 11.1% |
| Polytechnic diploma | 13.3% | 10.2% |
| Professional qualification and other diploma | 8.7% | 7.5% |
| University | 35.9% | 36.7% |

=== Employment and income ===
According to the 2025 General Household Survey, 168,900 of residents aged 15 years and over in Sengkang are employed, out of the 174,600 in the labour force. This equates to an employment rate of 96.7%. The remaining 63,600 residents (26.7%) aged above 15 in Sengkang are outside the labour force.

Gross monthly employment income of employed residents aged 15 years and over (2025 est.)
| Employment income | Percentage | Singapore average |
|---|---|---|
| Below S$1,000 | 4.1% | 3.9% |
| S$1,000–S$1,999 | 8.4% | 9.4% |
| S$2,000–S$2,999 | 9.3% | 9.5% |
| S$3,000–S$3,999 | 10.2% | 10.3% |
| S$4,000–S$4,999 | 8.2% | 8.8% |
| S$5,000–S$5,999 | 8.3% | 8.2% |
| S$6,000–S$6,999 | 7.3% | 6.9% |
| S$7,000–S$7,999 | 7.0% | 5.9% |
| S$8,000–S$8,999 | 5.2% | 5.2% |
| S$9,000–S$9,999 | 5.4% | 4.5% |
| S$10,000–S$10,999 | 5.2% | 4.3% |
| S$11,000–S$11,999 | 4.3% | 3.5% |
| S$12,000–S$14,999 | 7.5% | 7.3% |
| S$15,000–S$19,999 | 5.7% | 5.8% |
| S$20,000 and over | 4.0% | 6.7% |

Monthly household employment income (2025 est.)
| Household employment income | Percentage | Singapore average |
|---|---|---|
| No employed person | 8.1% | 14.2% |
| Below S$1,000 | 1.2% | 1.2% |
| S$1,000–S$1,999 | 2.8% | 3.4% |
| S$2,000–S$2,999 | 3.7% | 3.7% |
| S$3,000–S$3,999 | 4.3% | 4.2% |
| S$4,000–S$4,999 | 3.7% | 3.7% |
| S$5,000–S$5,999 | 3.8% | 4.1% |
| S$6,000–S$6,999 | 4.4% | 4.0% |
| S$7,000–S$7,999 | 3.8% | 3.6% |
| S$8,000–S$8,999 | 3.9% | 3.8% |
| S$9,000–S$9,999 | 4.0% | 3.7% |
| S$10,000–S$10,999 | 4.5% | 3.8% |
| S$11,000–S$11,999 | 4.8% | 3.7% |
| S$12,000–S$12,999 | 4.5% | 3.5% |
| S$13,000–S$13,999 | 4.4% | 3.2% |
| S$14,000–S$14,999 | 2.6% | 2.8% |
| S$15,000–S$17,499 | 7.2% | 6.2% |
| S$17,500–S$19,999 | 7.1% | 5.5% |
| S$20,000–S$24,999 | 10.2% | 8.0% |
| S$25,000–S$29,999 | 5.3% | 5.0% |
| S$30,000–S$34,999 | 2.9% | 3.3% |
| S$35,000 and over | 3.0% | 5.5% |

== Notable places ==
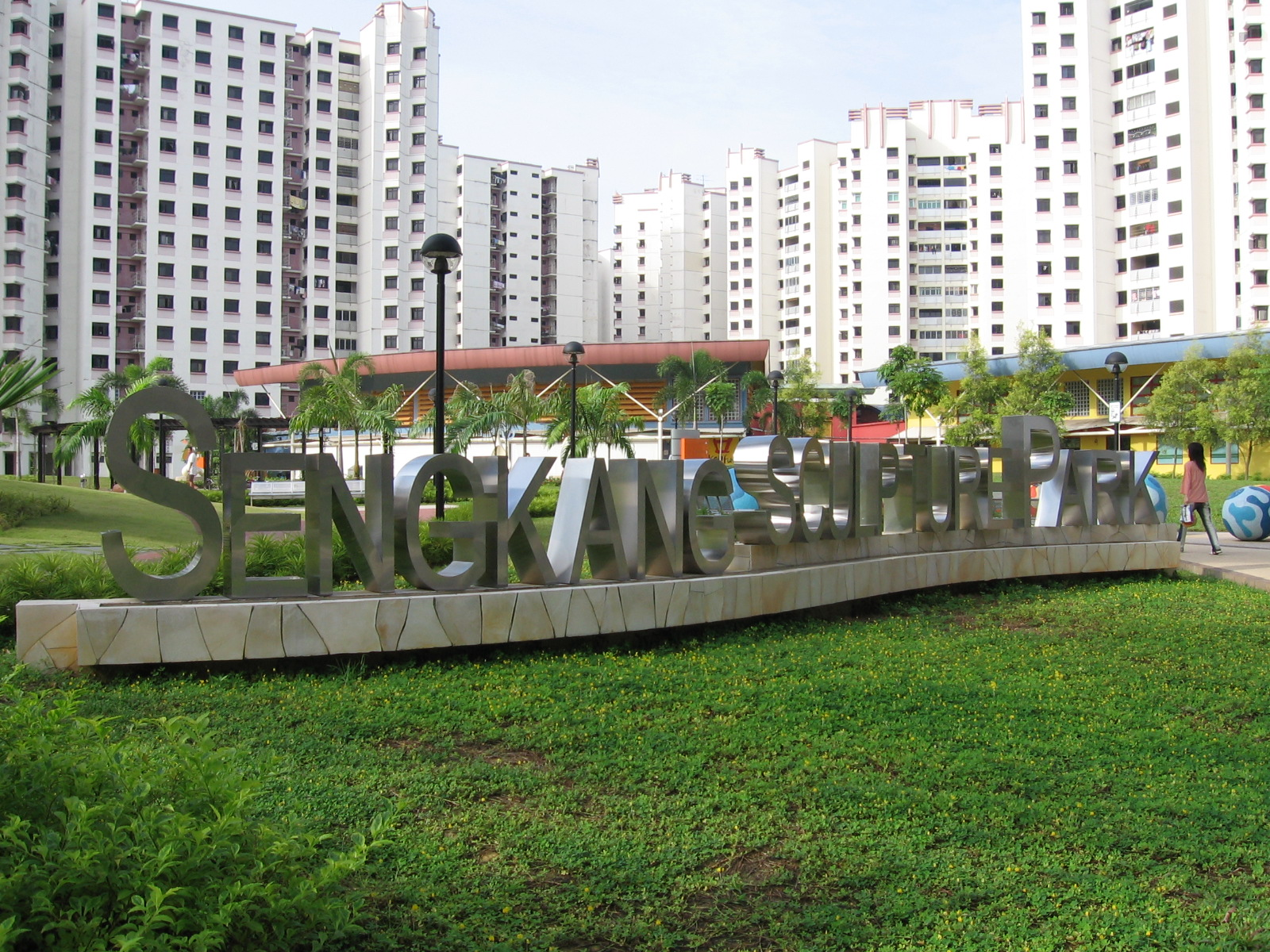
Sengkang Sculpture Park

Sengkang's two main rivers, Sungei Punggol and Sungei Serangoon, run through the town with a network of green connectors along their banks. They link housing precincts to neighbourhood parks such as Sengkang Riverside Park, as well as the Sengkang Swimming Complex, Sengkang Hockey Stadium, Lorong Halus and Anchorvale Community Centre. These park connectors are linked to the Coney Island Park in Punggol New Town and the existing Punggol Park in the south, to better serve the recreational needs of the residents of Sengkang. Sengkang Sculpture Park, located in Compassvale, is an elongated green space created below the LRT viaducts.

Sengkang's major public transport amenities were built in tandem with the main public housing development. The main heavy rail tunnels through Sengkang and the elevated track infrastructure of the intra-town Sengkang LRT were developed as the existing public housing blocks were being built in the late 1990s. The amenities were built in a contiguous building complex, which gives commuters direct access between Sengkang MRT/LRT station, Sengkang Bus Interchange, Compass Heights condominium and Compass One shopping centre. The Compassvale bus Interchange was later built besides Sengkang Bus Interchange, and came into operations on 12 March 2017.

== Transportation ==
City planners plan for public transport to eventually become the preferred mode of transport. The government of Singapore uses public transport to reduce pollution caused by heavy road traffic. Sengkang is part of the Urban Redevelopment Authority's focus for realising this urban planning model. As Sengkang is relatively distant from the city centre at the Central Area, an efficient, high-volume and high-speed public transport system is also preferred to using road networks, as the government is aiming to reduce the number of cars on the road.

=== Public transport ===
==== North East Line ====
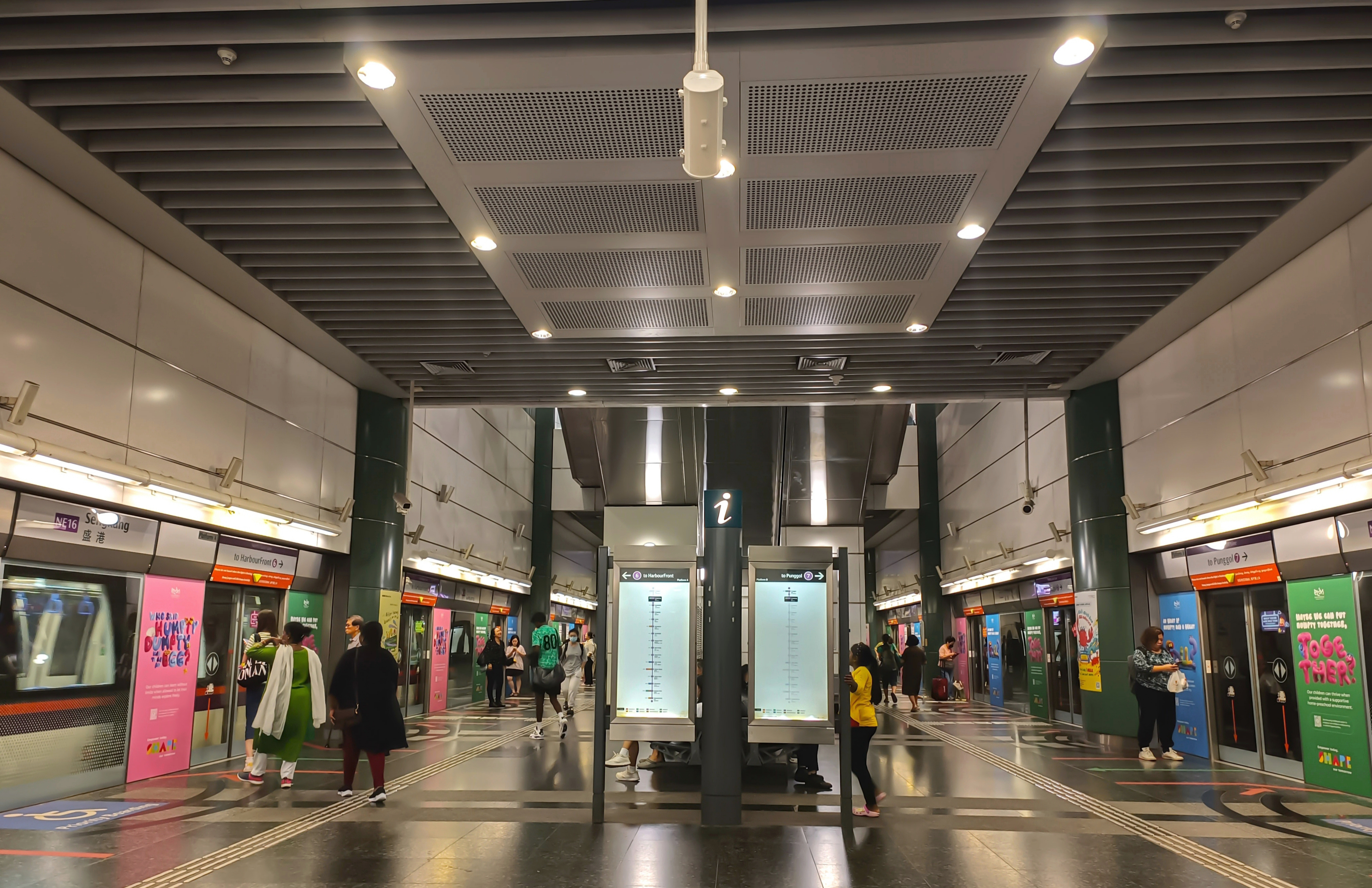
Sengkang MRT station platform

Sengkang Town is linked to the city via the North East Line (NEL) at Sengkang MRT/LRT station, located at the town centre, and Buangkok station, located at the southern end of the town. The NEL is a fully automated heavy rail mass rapid transit line which started operations on 20 June 2003. It is operated by SBS Transit.

Sengkang station, an interchange with the Sengkang LRT, shares a building complex with Sengkang Bus Interchange for commuters' ease of switching across the different available modes of public transport. The MRT portion of the station began operations on 20 June 2003, together with most of the NEL, whereas the LRT portion of the station had already opened on 18 January that year.

Buangkok station, the other station along the NEL in Sengkang Town, serves the housing developments in Buangkok, at Compassvale, and the northern part of Hougang New Town. The station was initially left unopened due to a lack of development in the vicinity, but started operations on 15 January 2006 once the first development in the area was completed.

==== Sengkang LRT line ====
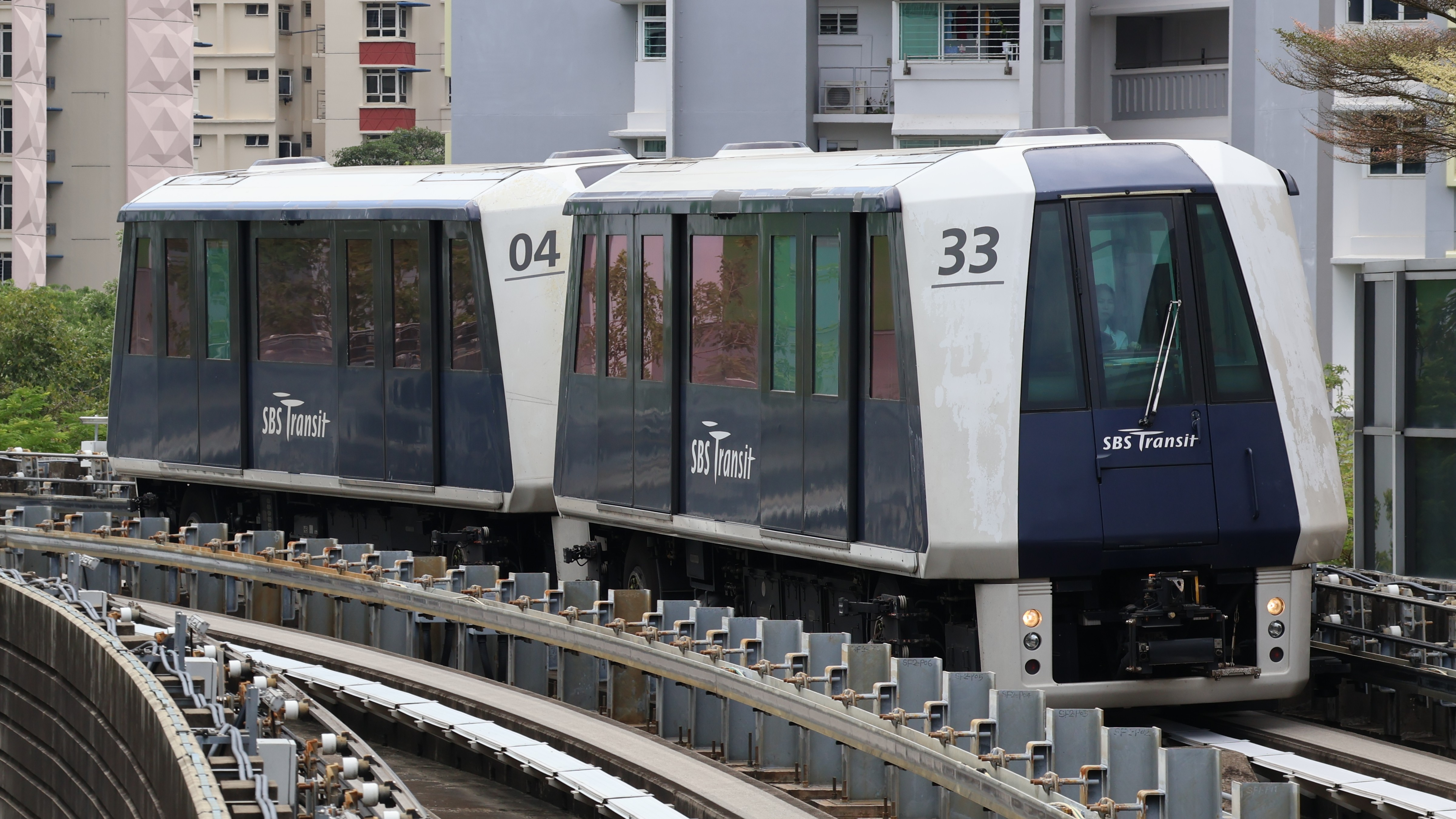
Sengkang LRT

The intra-town Sengkang Light Rail Transit (LRT) system is a 10.7 km light rail line that serves to link residents to the town centre. It is a fully automated system, and its rolling stock is supplied by Mitsubishi Heavy Industries. The system is also operated by SBS Transit. The Sengkang LRT line forms two loops, East Loop and West Loop, that skirt the perimeter of the new town. The LRT line has 14 stations and all are in operation. The line began service on 18 January 2003.

==== Sengkang Bus Interchange ====
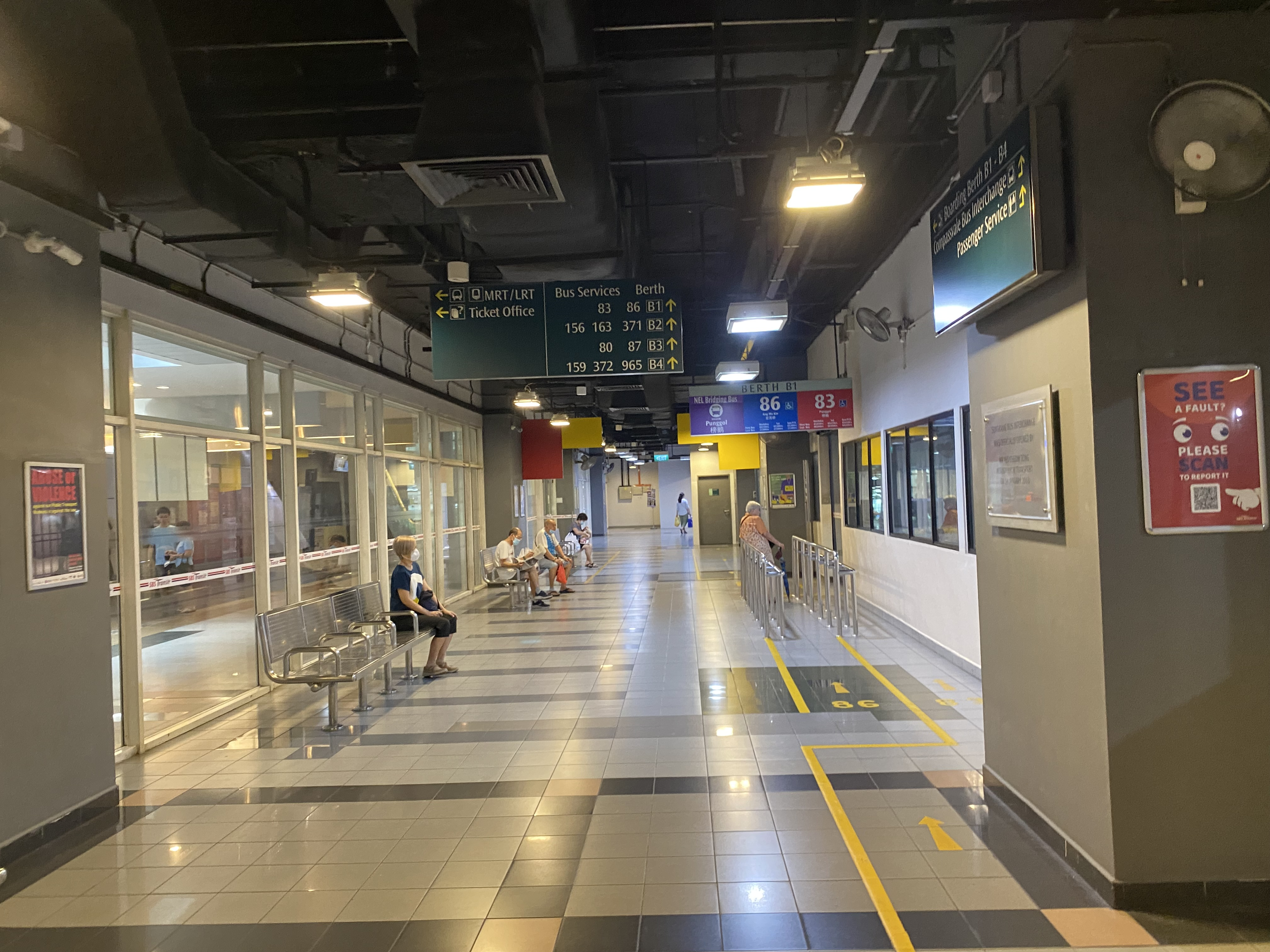
Sengkang Bus Interchange

The Sengkang Bus Interchange was opened on 12 June 1998 as a terminal. At that time, developments around the area in Sengkang New Town were still actively in progress. The Sengkang Bus Interchange is located at the ground level of Compass Heights condominium, next to Sengkang station, which was opened on 18 January 2003, and is the second air-conditioned bus interchange in Singapore, after Toa Payoh Bus Interchange.

==== Compassvale Bus Interchange ====
On 24 November 2014, LTA officially announced the expansion of the Sengkang Bus Interchange to accommodate future bus services under the Bus Service Enhancement Programme (BSEP) Scheme as the current interchange does not have enough parking spaces for more services. The expansion consists of 12 additional parking bays, boarding and alighting facilities, concourse area, staff lounge and a canteen. The expansion works were completed in the third quarter of 2016. The extension, named Compassvale Bus Interchange, is located adjacent to Sengkang Bus Interchange along Sengkang Square and it officially opened on 12 March 2017. With the opening of Buangkok Bus Interchange, the interchange has ceased to operate on 1 December 2024.

==== Buangkok Bus Interchange ====
A new bus interchange, Buangkok Bus Interchange, opened as part of a mixed, integrated development named Sengkang Grand Residences/Mall on 1 December 2024. The interchange was due to be completed by the third quarter of 2023 but was delayed. It is accessible from Exit A of Buangkok MRT station on the North East Line.

=== Road network ===
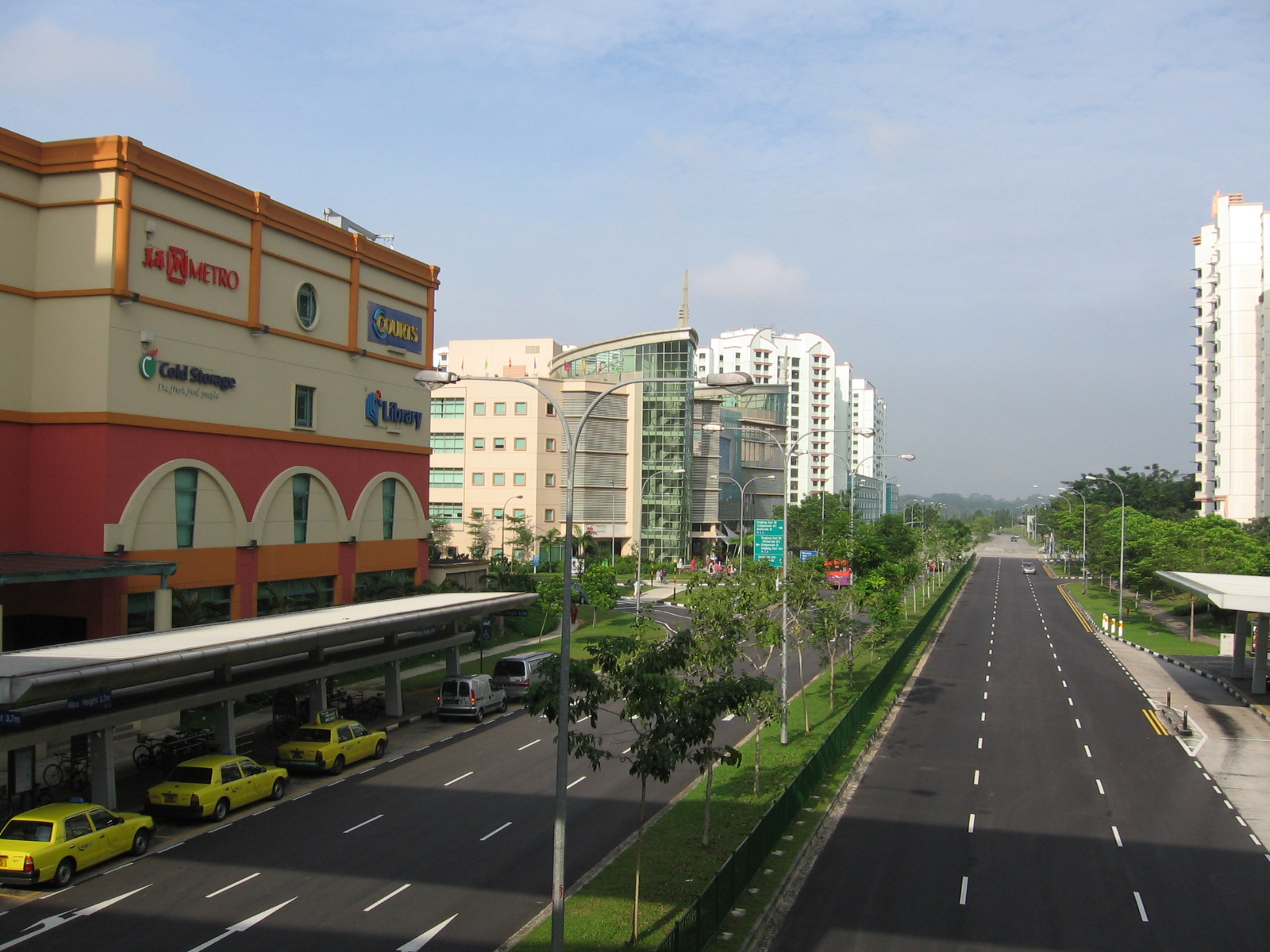
Sengkang East Way

Sengkang is connected to many parts of Singapore through its road network. The Tampines Expressway (TPE) links Sengkang Town up with Singapore's expressway network. The Kallang–Paya Lebar Expressway, which provides a direct route to the city area via TPE, was completed in late 2008. New roads were built in the early 2000s to ease traffic congestion on Punggol Road. Buangkok Green and Buangkok Drive were completed in the second half of 1999. They shorten the drive from the Central Expressway near Ang Mo Kio Avenue 5 to Punggol Road. The first part of a S$23 million project to make Sengkang town less congested was opened on 7 April 2001. The completed work involved an extension to Sengkang East Road, which runs from Compassvale Street to Tampines Expressway (TPE), and a slip road to the TPE in the direction of the Seletar and Central Expressways. The second part of the project involved the completion of the Sengkang East Road and Sengkang East Drive Flyovers. The Sengkang East Road and Sengkang East Drive Flyovers were officially opened on 16 May 2004, making it easier for residents of Sengkang and Punggol new towns in the north-east to travel to other parts of Singapore. Extensions had been made to Sengkang West Avenue and Sengkang West Way to connect to the future Sengkang West Industrial Park.

Major roads that run within the boundaries of Sengkang Planning Area include Sengkang East Drive, Sengkang East Avenue, Sengkang East Road, Sengkang East Way, Sengkang West Avenue, Sengkang West Road, Sengkang West Way and Jalan Kayu.

== Sengkang Town Centre ==
There are four major building complexes within the Sengkang Town Centre.

=== Compass Heights ===
Compass Heights is a private condominium complex that is integrated with public transportation facilities in its surroundings.

=== Compass One ===
Compass One, formerly known as Compass Point, is Singapore's first thematic suburban shopping centre based on the theme of learning, resulting in the inclusion of a public library. The Compass Point Shopping Centre was constructed at a cost of S$230 million. The shopping mall started operations in August 2002. The only other shopping mall predating Compass One in Sengkang is Rivervale Plaza, which was initially built with an open-bazaar concept with a wet market until its renovation in 2013, transforming it into an official shopping mall. Compass One also is connected to the Sengkang MRT Station.

=== Sengkang Community Hub ===
Sengkang Community Hub, and its community club and neighbourhood police centre, were officially opened by Teo Chee Hean, Minister for Defence and Member of Parliament for Pasir Ris-Punggol Group Representation Constituency, on 10 December 2005. Some of the facilities that it houses are the KK Women's Clinic @ Sengkang, Sengkang Central Constituency Office, Sengkang Neighbourhood Police Centre, Sengkang Community Club, and the Sengkang Branch of Singapore Post Office.

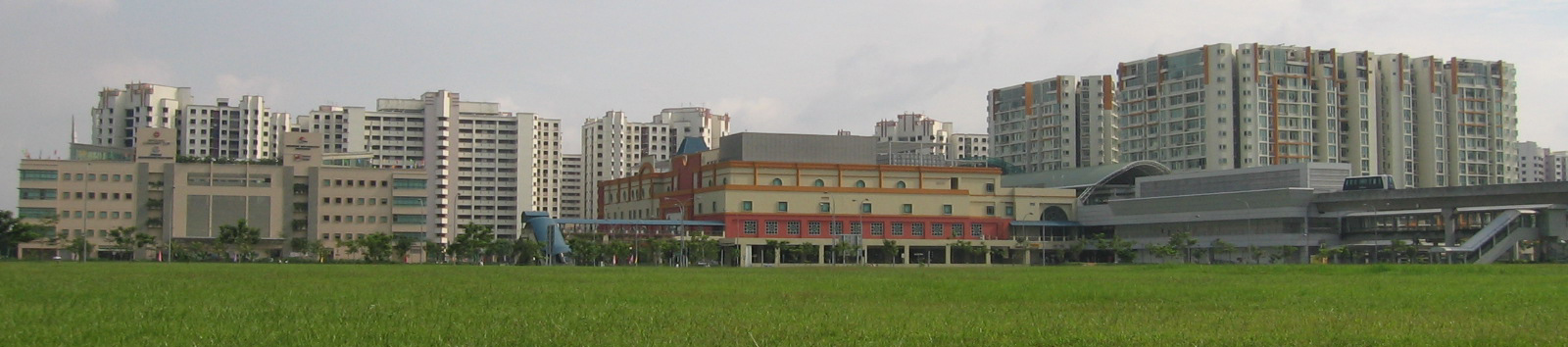
Sengkang Town Centre in 2005. The building complexes are, from left to right, Sengkang Community Hub, Compass Point Shopping Centre (now called Compass One), Sengkang station and Bus Interchange, and Compass Heights condominium.

== Amenities ==
=== Education ===
There are twelve primary schools and seven secondary schools in Sengkang New Town as of 2026. The list of schools is as follows:

==== Primary schools ====
- Anchor Green Primary School
- Compassvale Primary School
- Fern Green Primary School
- Fernvale Primary School
- Nan Chiau Primary School
- North Spring Primary School
- North Vista Primary School
- Palm View Primary School
- Rivervale Primary School
- Seng Kang Primary School
- Sengkang Green Primary School
- Springdale Primary School

==== Secondary schools ====
- CHIJ St. Joseph's Convent
- Compassvale Secondary School
- Nan Chiau High School
- North Vista Secondary School
- Outram Secondary School (from 2026)
- Pei Hwa Secondary School
- Seng Kang Secondary School

There are also five large childcare centres being built since then, to provide the needs of the town's large demographic of young families. Land provision has also been made for a junior college in the town to meet future educational demand in the North-East Region.

=== Commercial facilities ===
The town depended on one neighbourhood mall; Rivervale Plaza, which was built by HDB and opened in 1999 with a wet market, several shops and a NTUC Fairprice supermarket, before Rivervale Mall opened in 2001. Compass Point opened in 2002, a year before the Sengkang MRT/LRT station & air-conditioned bus interchange opened.

Fernvale Point served the residents of Sengkang West and mostly Fernvale for almost ten years, which was eventually demolished. Seletar Mall, opened in 2014 with the first cinema in Sengkang (closed in Dec 2024).

Anchorvale Village, a mixed residential/commercial development; originally slated to open by 2022, will open with a 3-storey hawker centre and neighbourhood shops within its compound below HDB blocks. As of 2024, the development's opened in May 2024.

=== Community facilities ===
The first community centre of the new town, Rivervale Community Centre, was opened on 20 June 2004, by Teo Chee Hean, Minister of Defence and Member of Parliament for Pasir Ris-Punggol Group Representation Constituency, which was situated at the void deck of Blk 193 Rivervale Drive. It served residents of the town a year before Sengkang Community Club opened a year later at the Town Centre.

Anchorvale Community Club opened beside the Sengkang Sports Complex in 2009, while the Fernvale Community Club opened in 2022 with a hawker centre, childcare and a wet market.

A new standalone building behind Rivervale Plaza, Rivervale Community Club, was built to replace the old Rivervale Community Centre. It was opened on 30 July 2022.

The HDB Branch Office for Sengkang is at Rivervale Plaza.

=== Fire stations ===
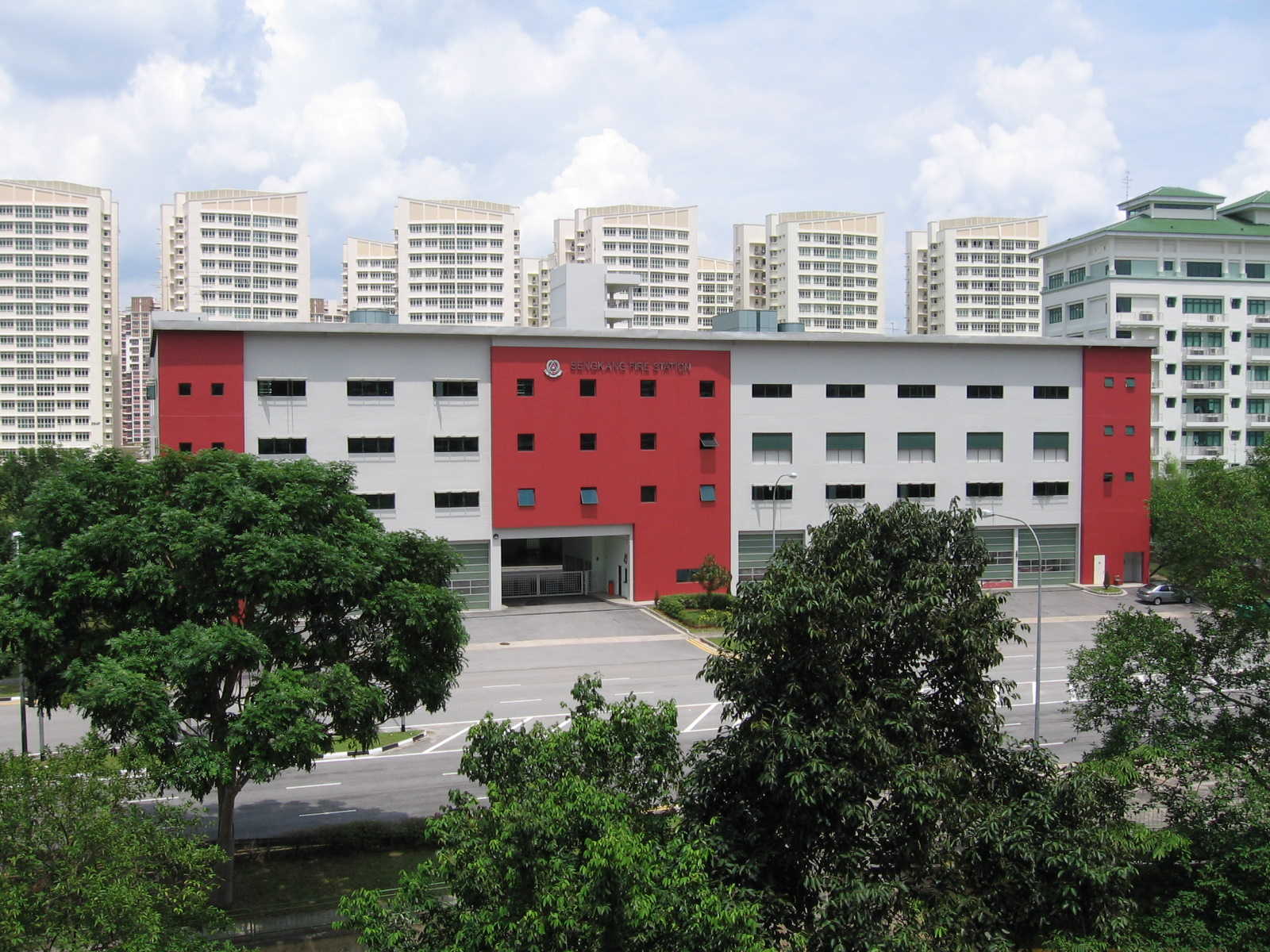
Sengkang Fire Station

Sengkang Fire Station, which opened on 19 May 2001, is the biggest fire station in Singapore. The S$14 million fire station covers 7,000 square metres, and is used by the Singapore Civil Defense Force. Sengkang Fire Station has a capacity for 700 fire fighters and rescue personnel. It is also the first station to employ a water conservation system where water used during drills are diverted to a pump well for recycling purposes.

=== Medical facilities ===
Sengkang General and Community Hospital is a 1,400 bed regional hospital serving the residents of the north-east region. The hospital was opened on 18 August 2018. Also located in Sengkang is the SingHealth Sengkang Polyclinic.

=== Sports facilities ===
Sengkang Sports Centre, formerly known as Sengkang Sports and Recreation Centre, it is co-located with the People’s Association Anchorvale Community Club, and offers one of the two sheltered pools managed by Sports Singapore. Sengkang has established itself as a world-class venue for hockey, with significant facility upgrades being undertaken for the inaugural Youth Olympic Games in 2010.

== Politics ==
Geographically, most but not all (e.g. Buangkok, Fernvale and Jalan Kayu) parts of Sengkang fall under Sengkang GRC.
1 Anchorvale
2 Buangkok
3 Compassvale
4 Rivervale

In the early days of Sengkang prior to the new town creation, Sengkang was part of the Punggol Constituency until 1991, where said ward was drawn into Cheng San GRC. In 2001, it was redrawn into two constituencies, Ang Mo Kio GRC (representing the western Sengkang areas) and Pasir Ris-Punggol GRC (representing the town centre and central and eastern Sengkang areas). Both of their smaller divisions, Sengkang West SMC (which represent Anchorvale and portions of Fernvale) and Punggol East SMC (represents most of Rivervale), was later hived off from their respective wards in 2011.

In 2020, Punggol East SMC, the eastern portion of Sengkang West SMC and Sengkang Central division were consolidated into the namesake Sengkang GRC, which comprised the neighborhoods of Anchorvale, Compassvale and Rivervale, and the Town Centre. Fernvale was fully incorporated into Ang Mo Kio GRC, and by 2025, most of Fernvale now forms the boundaries of Jalan Kayu SMC, while some of Buangkok (including Kampong Lorong Buangkok) and southern Fernvale form the Buangkok–Fernvale South ward of Ang Mo Kio GRC.

=== Town councils ===
Following the 2025 general election, the town of Sengkang is split across three distinct jurisdictions: Sengkang Town Council (SKTC), Ang Mo Kio Town Council (AMKTC), and Jalan Kayu Town Council (JKTC). The neighborhoods of Anchorvale, Compassvale and Rivervale, and the Town Centre are governed by the SKTC, which is administered by the opposition Workers' Party (WP). Conversely, the Fernvale and Sengkang West areas fall under AMKTC and JKTC and are managed by the ruling People's Action Party (PAP), which forms the national government.

Historically, Sengkang's local administration has undergone multiple structural changes prior to 2015. The area was originally overseen by the Cheng San Town Council from its initial development until the council's dissolution in 2001. Following this reorganisation, the Punggol Central wards shifted to the Pasir Ris–Punggol jurisdiction between 2001 and 2020. Meanwhile, Jalan Kayu was carved into Sengkang West and placed under Ang Mo Kio from 2001 onward, with a portion of the town briefly managed by WP's Aljunied–Hougang–Punggol East when it controlled Punggol East SMC from 2013 to 2015.

== See also ==
- New towns of Singapore
- List of Kangchu system placename etymologies
