= Sengkang Riverside Park =

Riverline park in Singapore

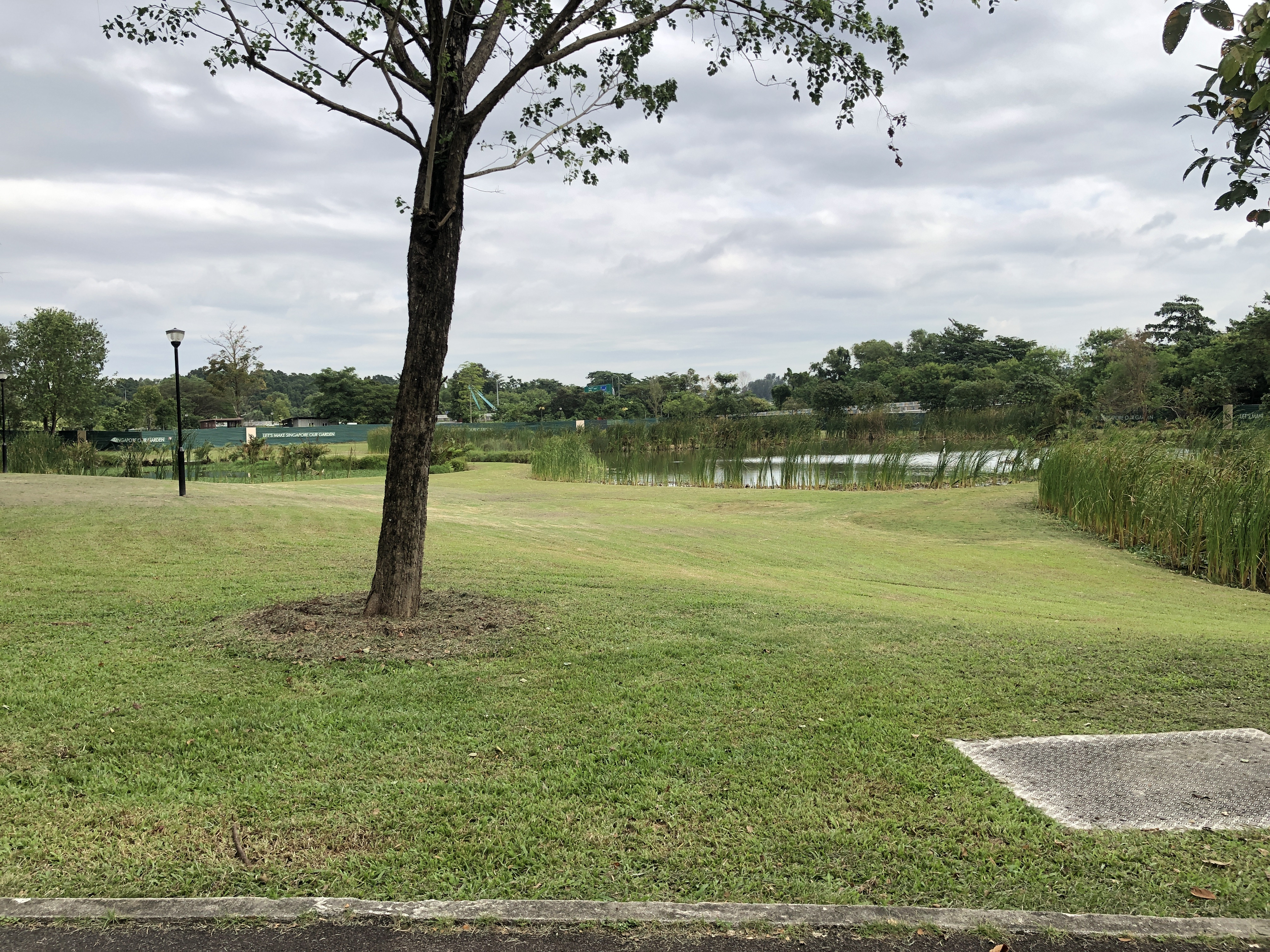

- Location within Singapore
- Location: Anchorvale Street, Sengkang, Singapore
- Coordinates: 1°23′53.5″N 103°53′02.0″E
- Area: 21 hectares (52 acres)
- Opened: November 2008; 17 years ago
- Manager: National Parks Board
- Operator: National Parks Board

Sengkang Riverside Park is a riverine park located at Anchorvale Street and Fernvale Street abutting Sungei Punggol, Singapore. The park consist of three open-space land parcels and is also home to a constructed wetland. The Sengkang Sports Centre is located just adjacent to the riverine park, connected by a floating wetland, Sengkang Floating Wetland.

== History ==
The 21-hectare park was opened to the public in November 2008. The park is situated alongside the Sungei Punggol. The integration of urban planning and protection of Singapore's water resources has earned Sengkang Riverside Park an ABC Waters Certification.

=== Sengkang Floating Wetland ===
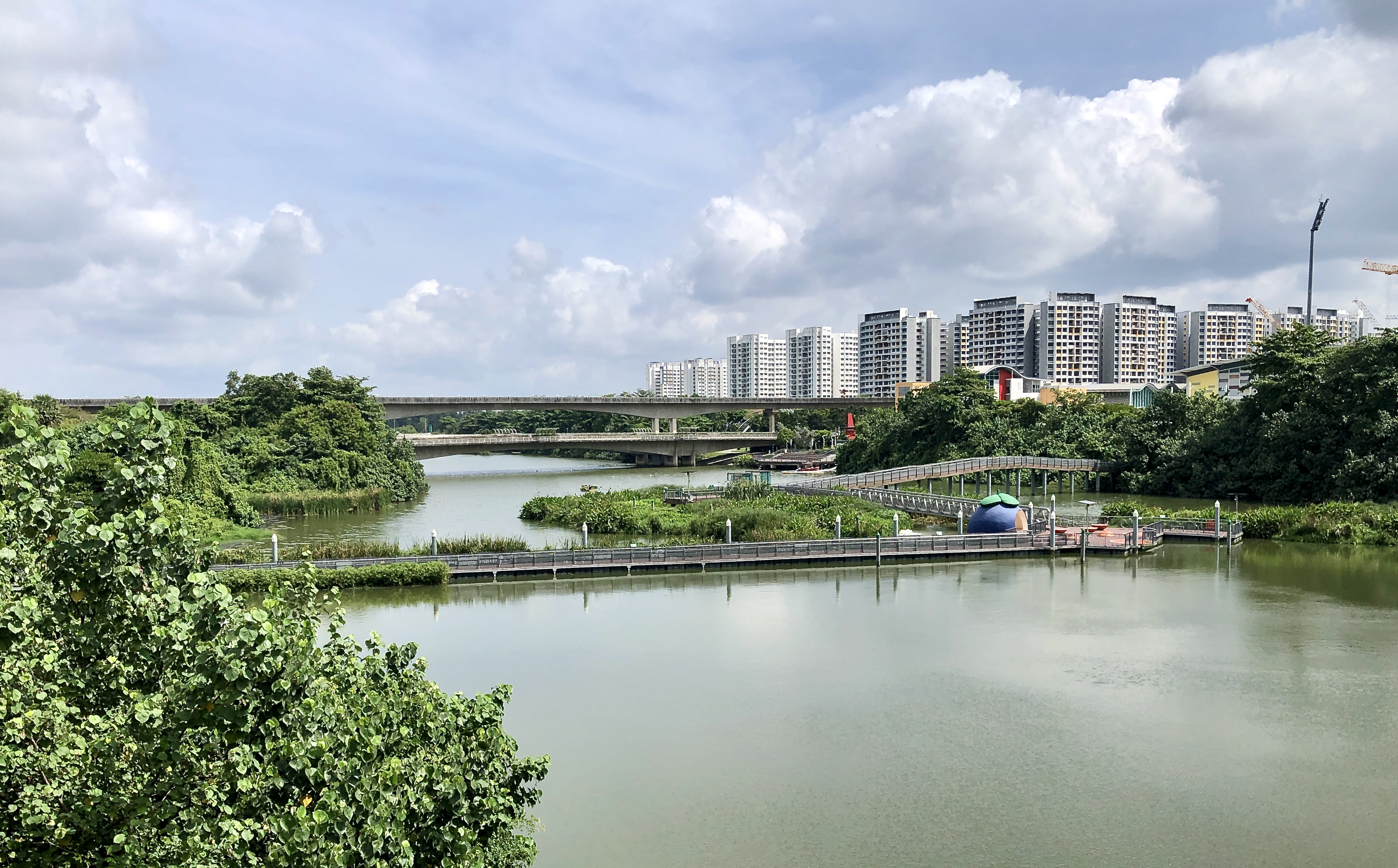
Sengkang Floating Wetland

On 7 November 2010, Prime Minister Lee Hsien Loong officially opened the floating wetland that is designed with a "fruitful" theme. The wetland is about half the size of a football field, and connects the Sengkang Riverside Park with the Sengkang Sports Centre. The floating wetland helps to collect and filter rainwater naturally through its aquatic plants. The wetland also acts as a habitat for fish, birds and other wildlife. Since the completion of the wetland, more birds and dragonflies were noticed to be attracted in the area.

== Facilities ==
=== Visitor centre ===
The Visitor Centre is a covered meeting point, located at the central part of the park. The sheltered centre provides visitors to the park with a shelter from bad weather. Public toilets and vending machines are also available here.

=== Fruit Tree Trail ===
Sengkang Riverside Park is also unique for its Fruit Tree Trail that consist of 16 different fruit trees, with some that cannot be found in the local supermarkets and are really rare. The trail runs along the parameters of the constructed wetlands. The 16 different fruit trees that can be found in the trail are Mangosteen Tree, Ordeal Tree, Custard Apple, Pomelo, Lime, Weeping Tea Tree, Island Lychee, Mango, Pond Apple Tree, Asam Tree, Java Olive Tree, Elephant Apple, Fish Killer Tree, Starfruit, Pig's Mango and Wine Palm.

=== Others ===
Visitors to the park can use the available facilities to cycle and exercise at the park. There are various resting points throughout the park and along the tracks. The Civic Event Lawn at the park provides a venue for events to be hosted here.

== Travel ==
The park can be reached via the Sengkang LRT line at Farmway LRT station & Kupang LRT station. Visitors can also choose to reach there by car, where the park's car park is located in front of the Visitor Centre.

== See also ==
- List of parks in Singapore
