= Anchorvale =

- Subzone of Sengkang Planning Area

Name transcription(s)
  - Chinese: 安谷
  - Pinyin: āngǔ
- Location of Anchorvale within Singapore
- Coordinates: 1°23′33.45″N 103°53′20.63″E
- Country: Singapore

Area
  - Total: 1.50 km^{2} (0.58 sq mi)

Population (2026)
  - Total: 52,080
  - Density: 34,700/km^{2} (89,900/sq mi)

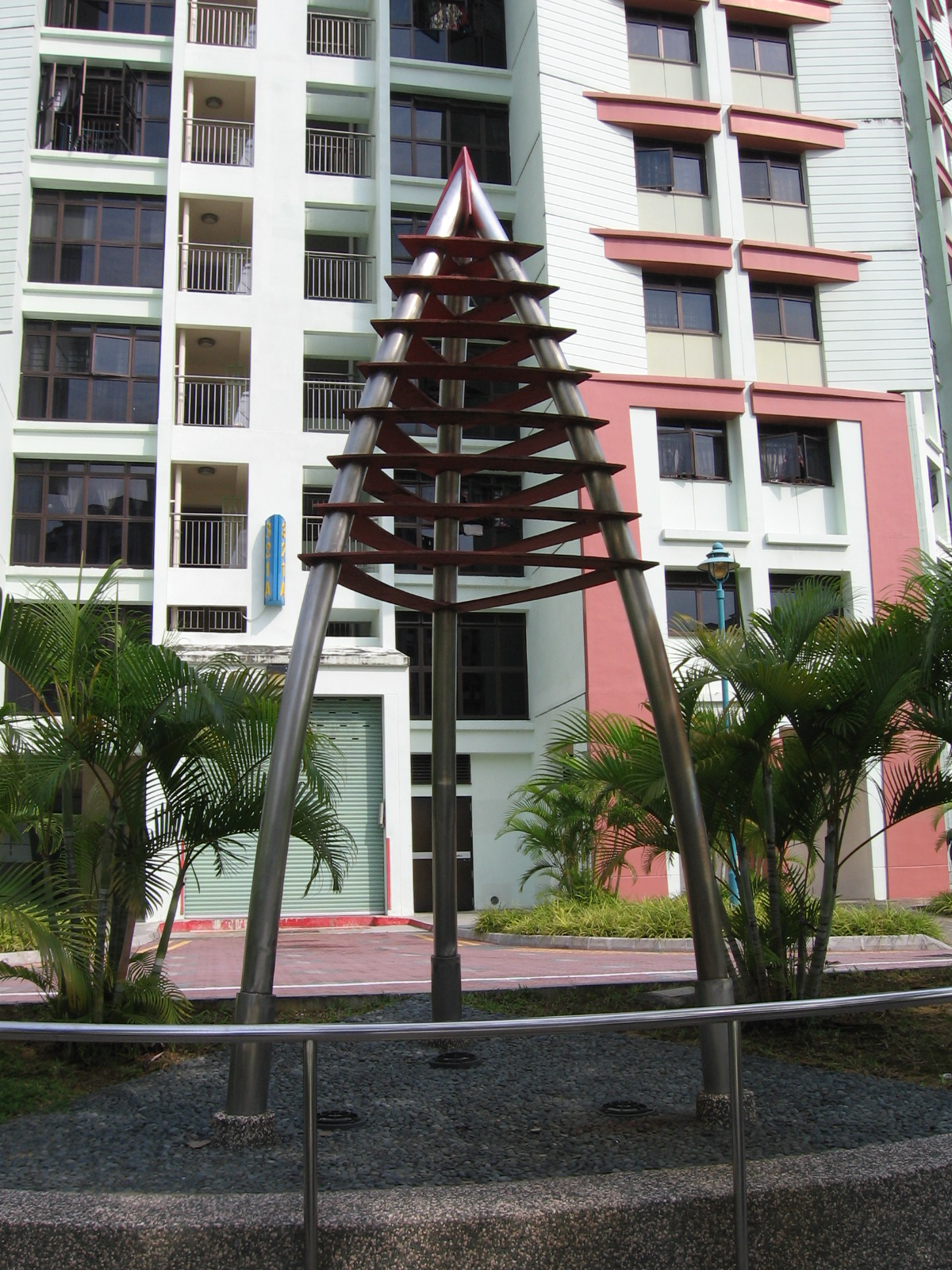
A landmark at Anchorvale.

Anchorvale is a neighbourhood of Sengkang New Town in Singapore between Sungei Punggol and Compassvale. House numbers of its public apartment blocks begin with the number '3' (3xx). These housing estates were fully completed by the Housing and Development Board (HDB) in 2001.

Anchorvale Village, a mixed-use retail and hawker centre, was opened on 18 May 2024, linked to several newly built housing blocks. Outram Secondary School will be relocated to Anchorvale Crescent in 2026, as announced by the Ministry of Education (MOE), on 16 January 2024.

== Educational institutions ==
Primary schools

- Anchor Green Primary School 安泰小学 Sekolah Rendah Anchor Green
- Nan Chiau Primary School 南桥小学 Sekolah Rendan Nan Chiau
- Springdale Primary School 康德小学 Sekolah Rendah Springdale

Secondary schools

- Nan Chiau High School 南桥中学 Sekolah Tinggi Nan Chiau

== Places of worship ==
Buddhist temple

- Puat Jit Buddhist Temple (般若念佛堂)

Chinese temples

- Nanyang Thong Hong Siang Tng Temple (南洋同奉善堂)
- Chee Hwan Kog Temple (济芳阁)

Church

- Sengkang Methodist Church

== Other facilities ==
- Sengkang Sports Centre/Anchorvale Community Club
- Sengkang General Hospital
- Anchorvale Village

== Public transport ==
The Anchorvale neighbourhood is linked to Sengkang Bus Interchange, Sengkang MRT/LRT station and Compassvale Bus Interchange at the town centre via bus services originating from the Sengkang Bus Interchange, Compassvale Bus Interchange and other parts of the island. The west loop of the Sengkang LRT line also serves the area, at the Cheng Lim, Farmway, Tongkang and Renjong LRT stations.

Service 110, which plies between Compassvale Bus Interchange and Changi Airport, connects residents to the four airport terminals and the bus stops along TPE before and after Punggol Road near Punggol Flyover. It also serves as an alternate service toward the airport for residents of the town centre, and Fernvale residents close to Anchorvale.

The neighborhood's eastern portion is in the vicinity of the Sengkang Town Centre. Many residents there also have direct access to Sengkang MRT/LRT station.

== Gallery ==
Housing estates

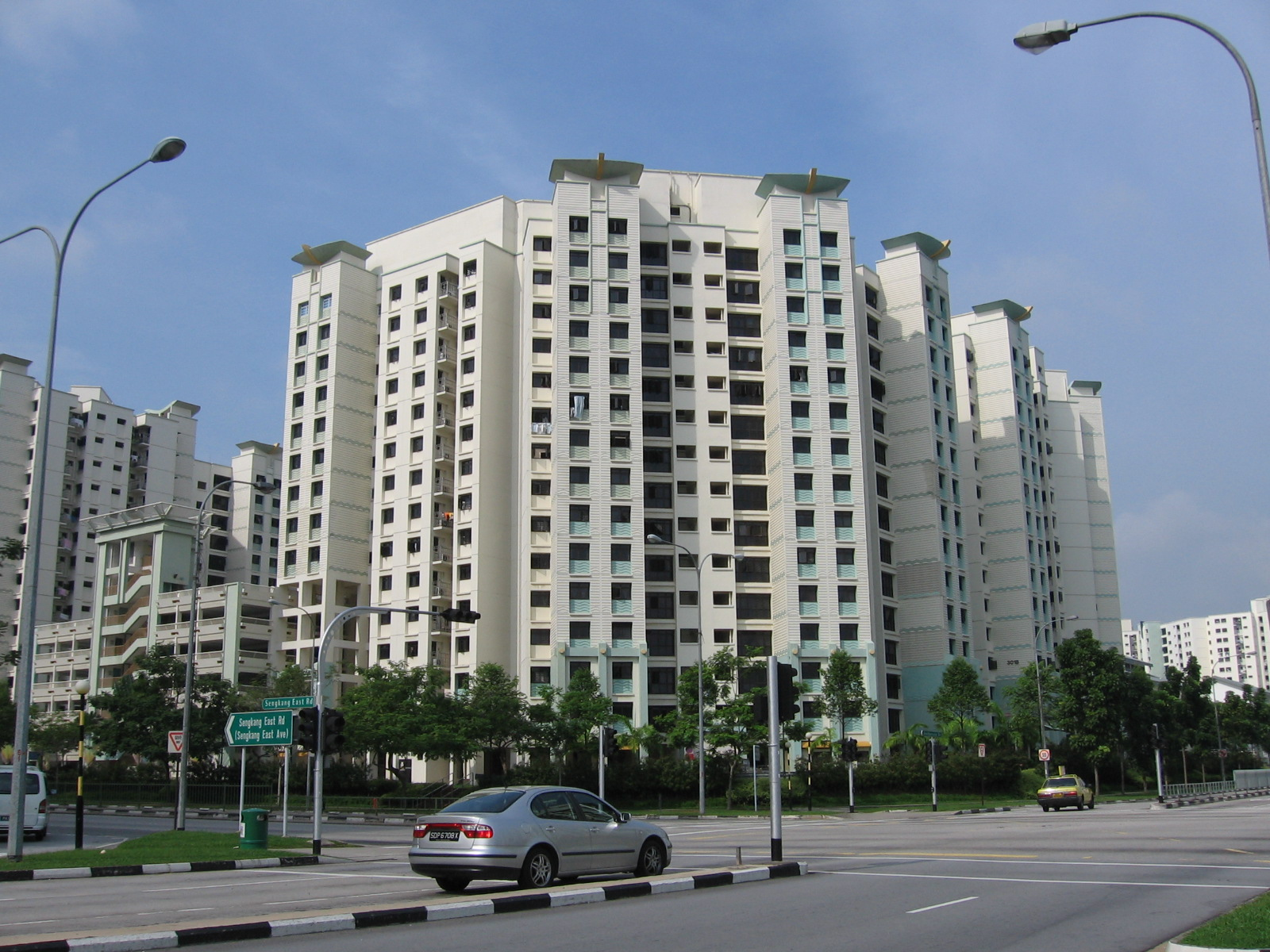
Anchorvale Court

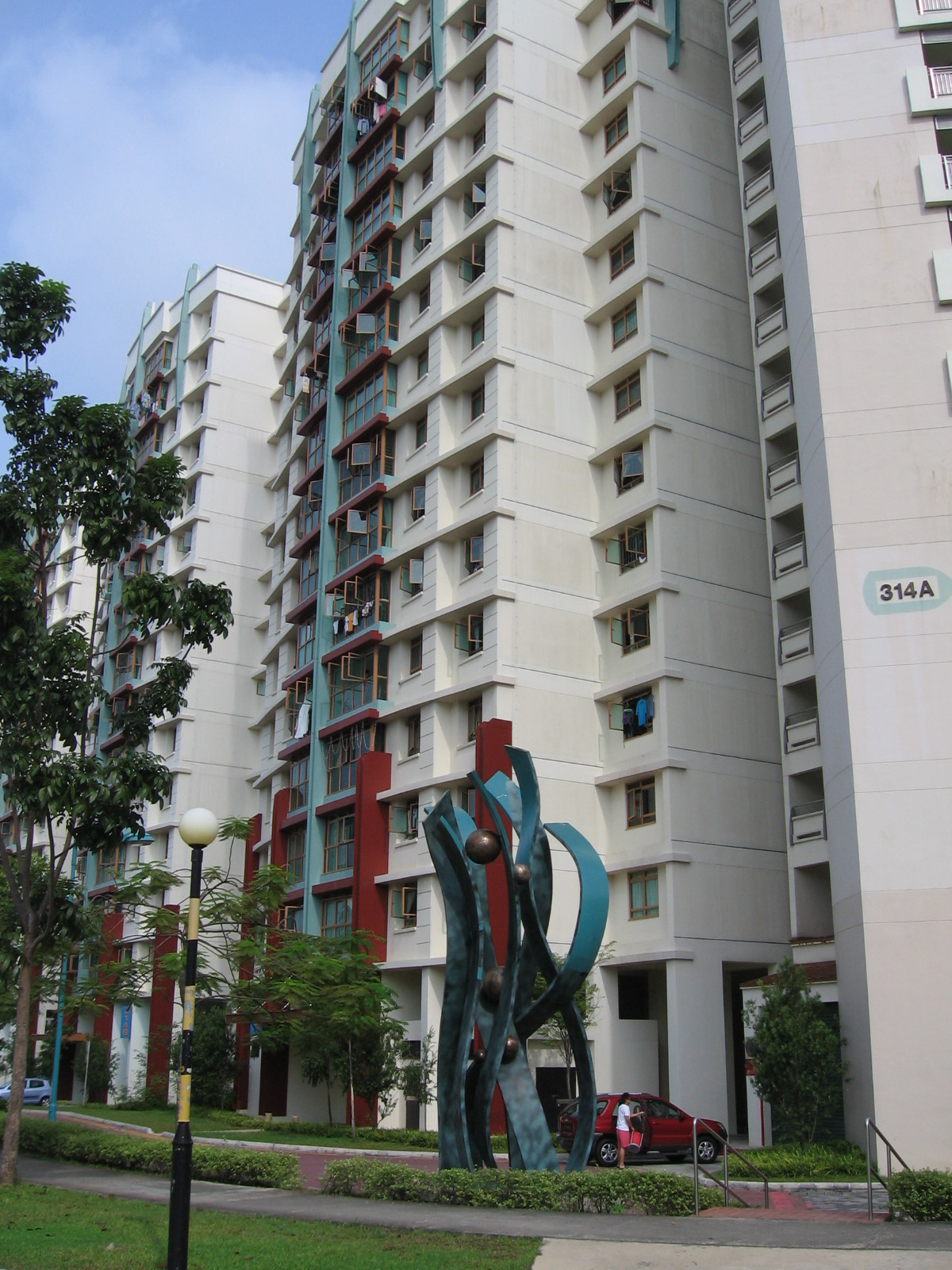
Anchorvale Gardens

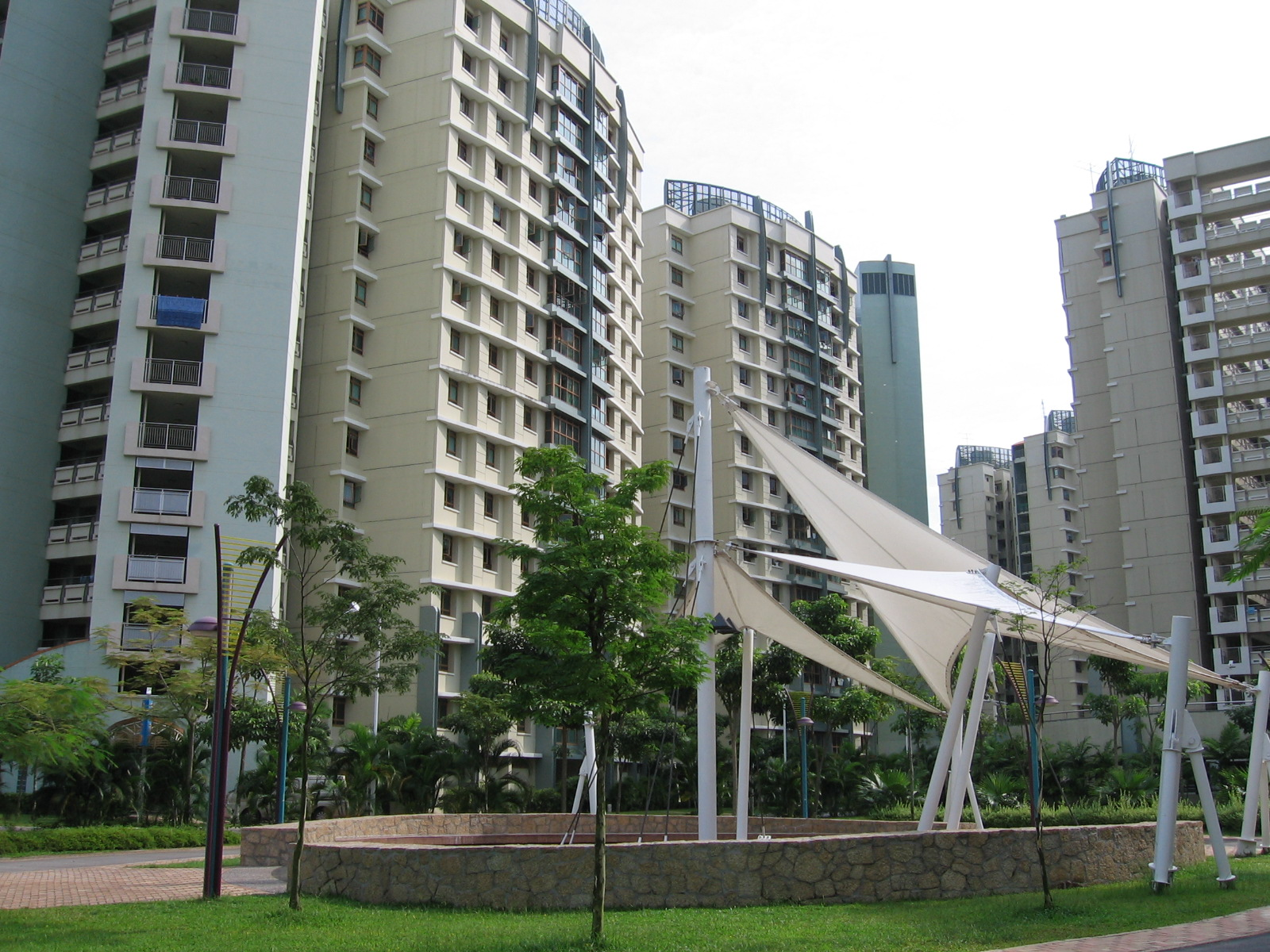
Anchorvale Gardens

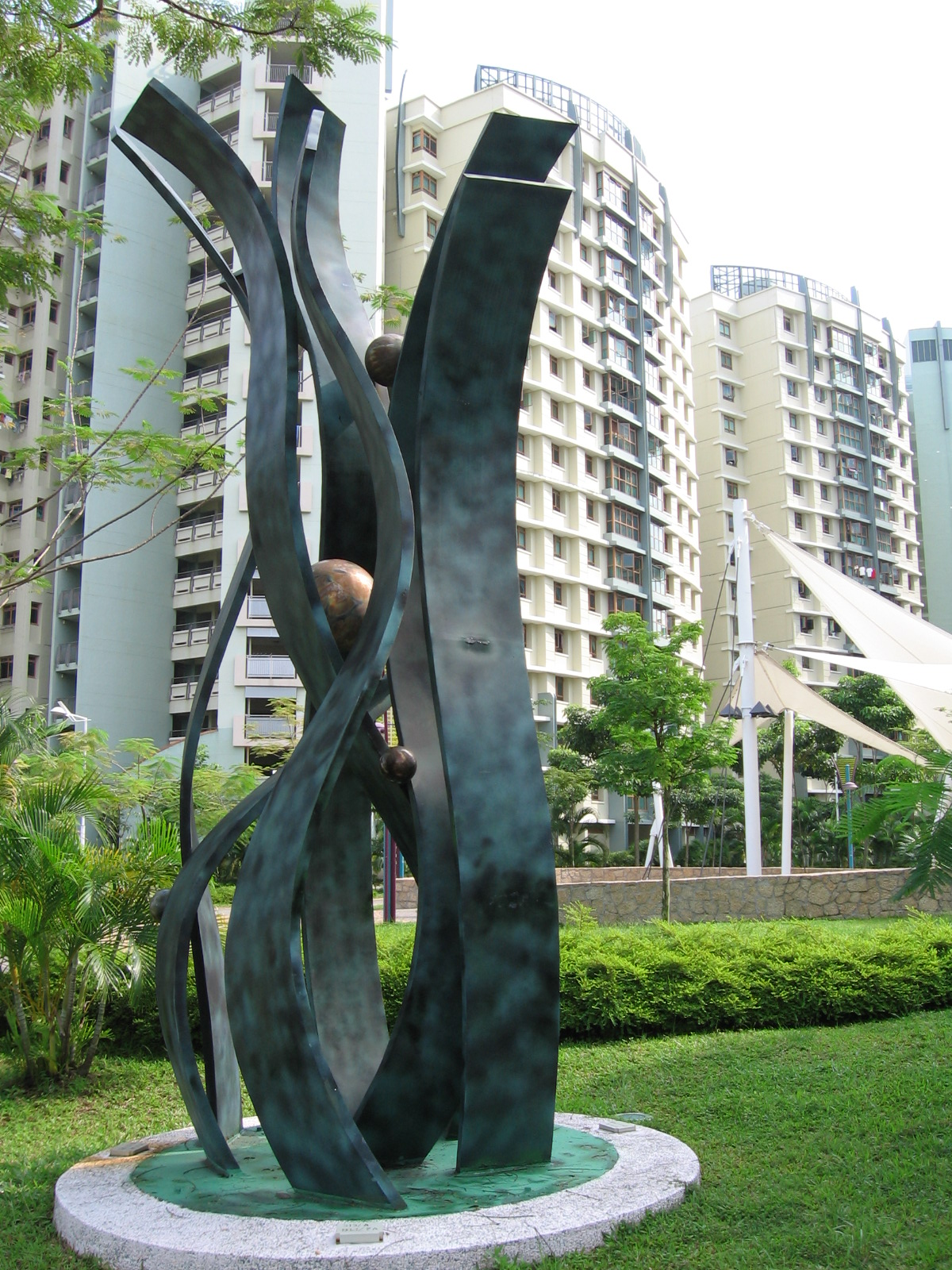
Anchorvale Gardens

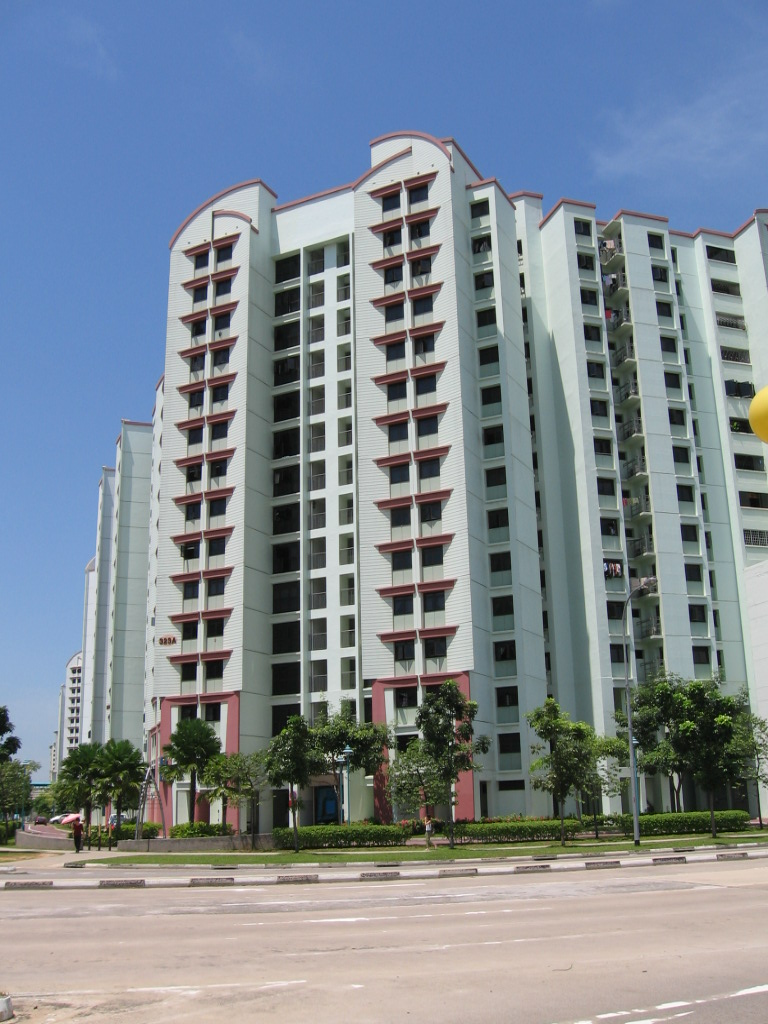
Anchorvale Grove

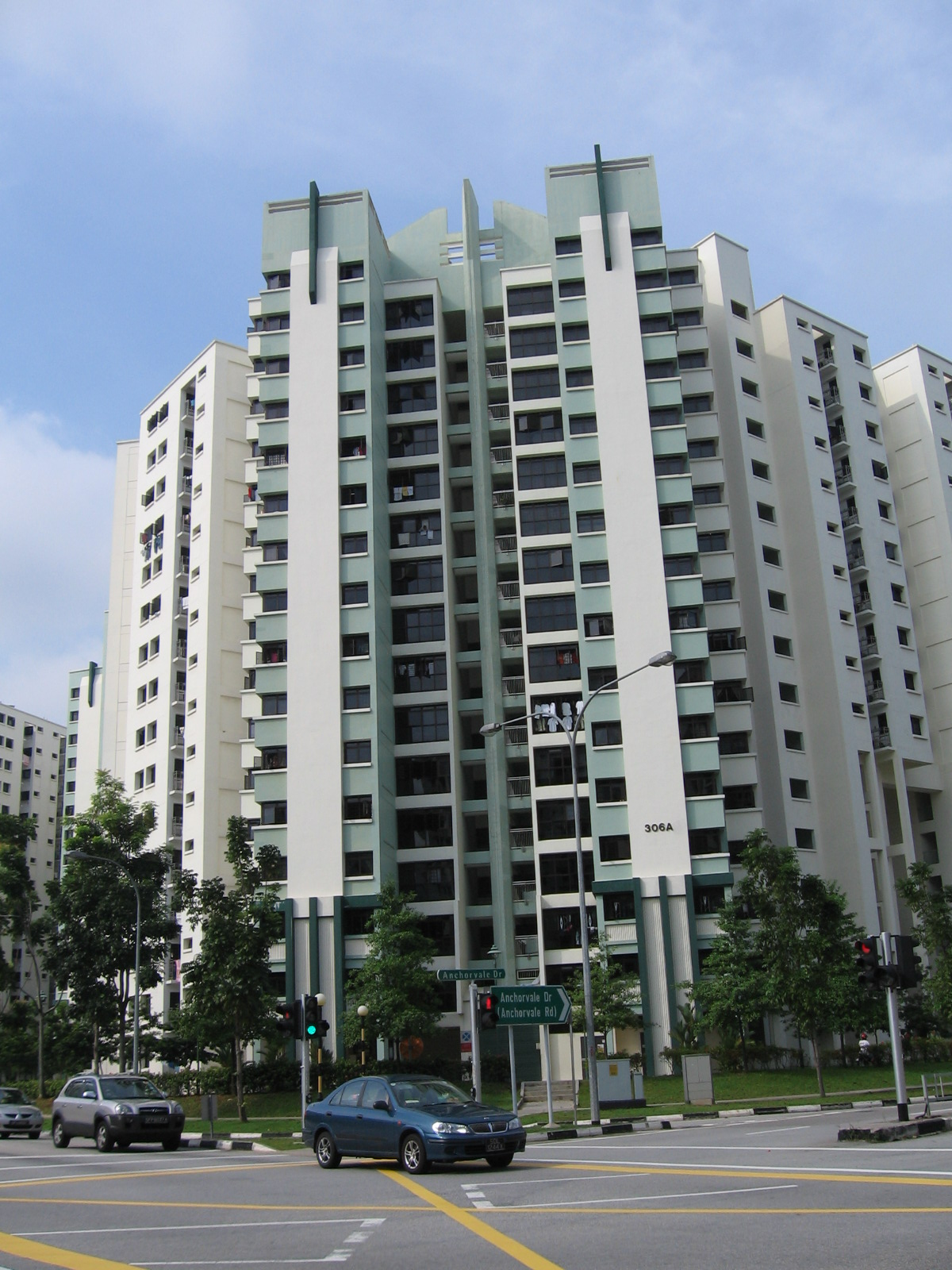
Anchorvale Place

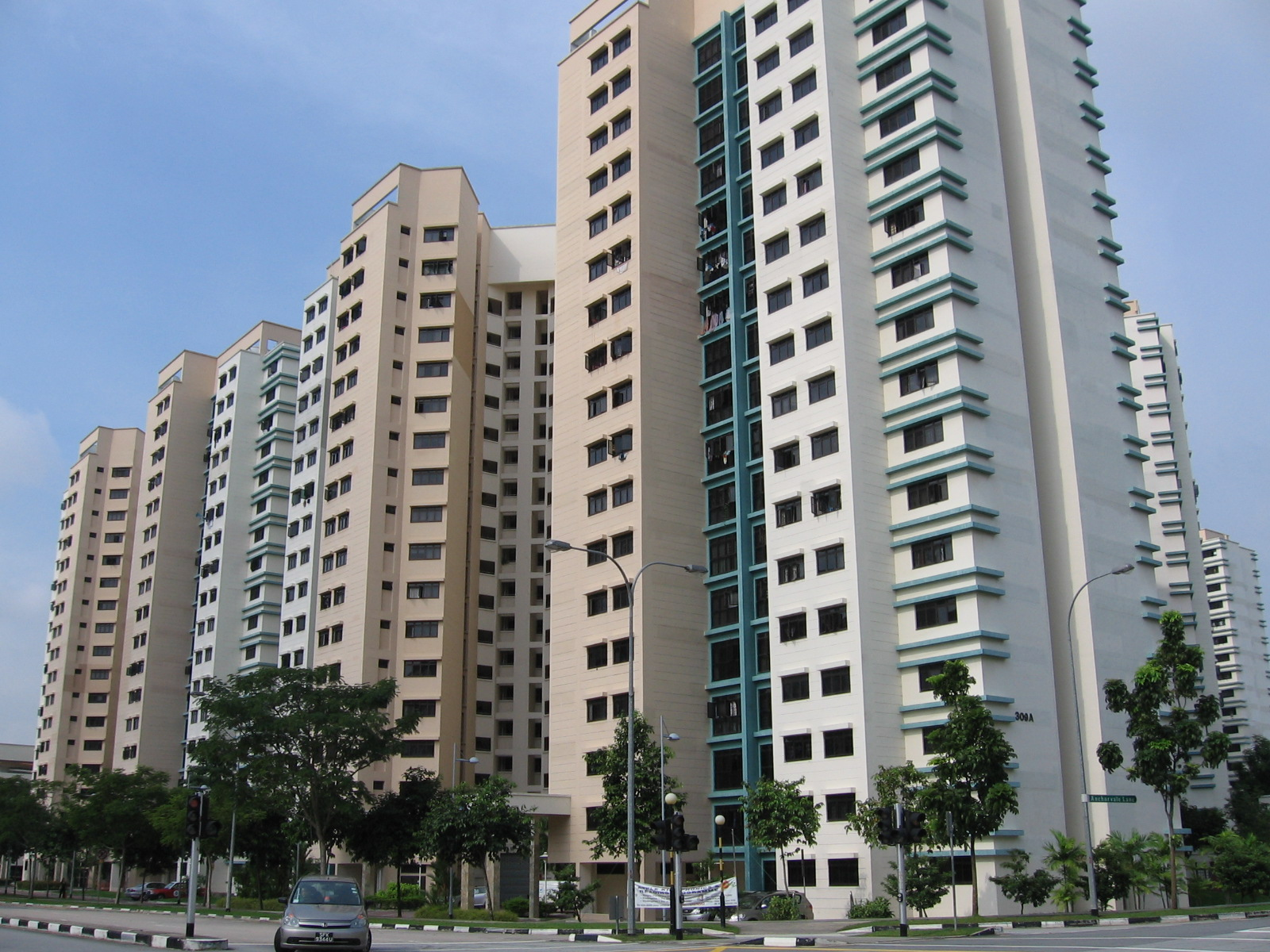
Anchorvale Vista

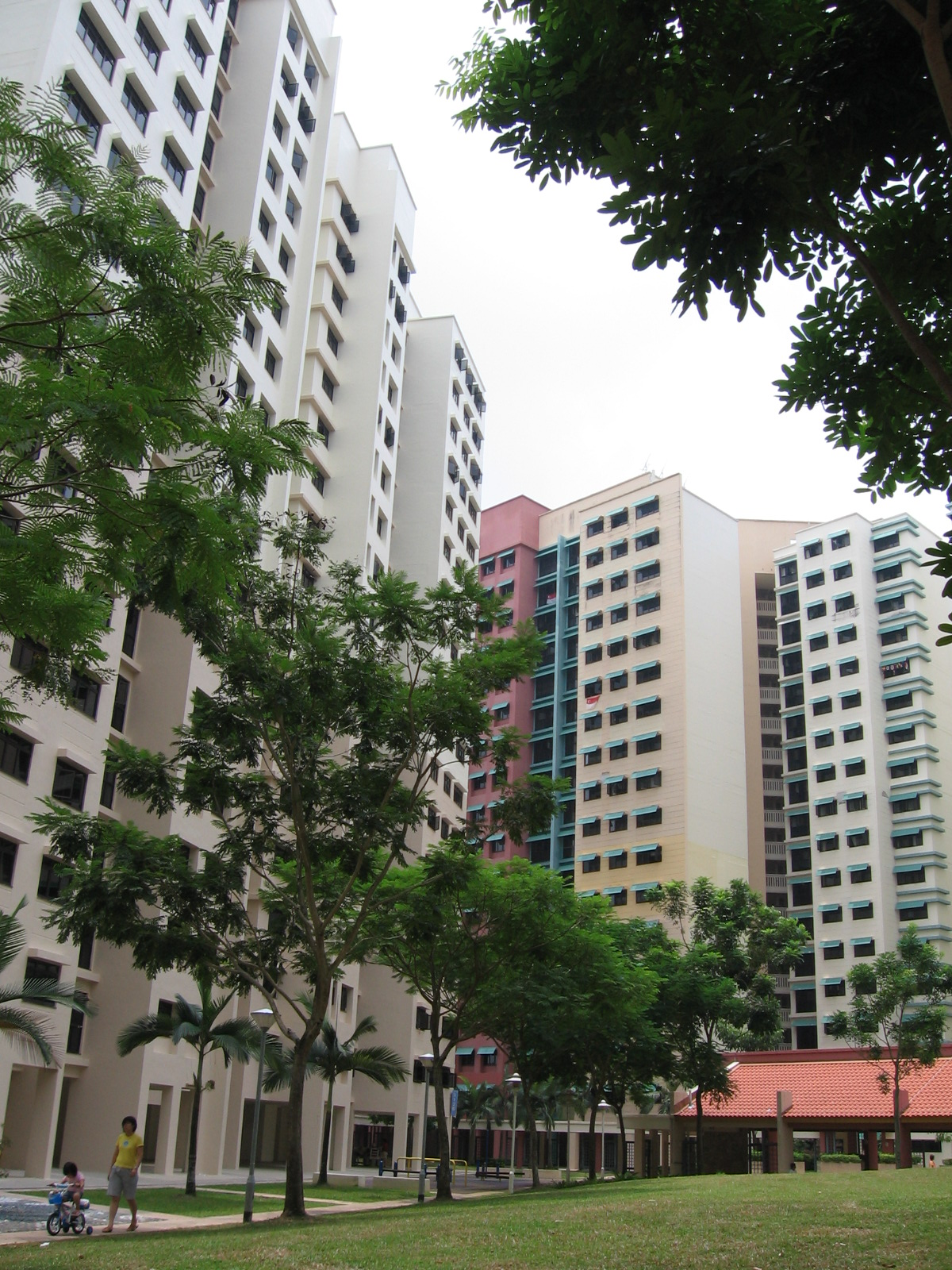
Anchorvale Vista

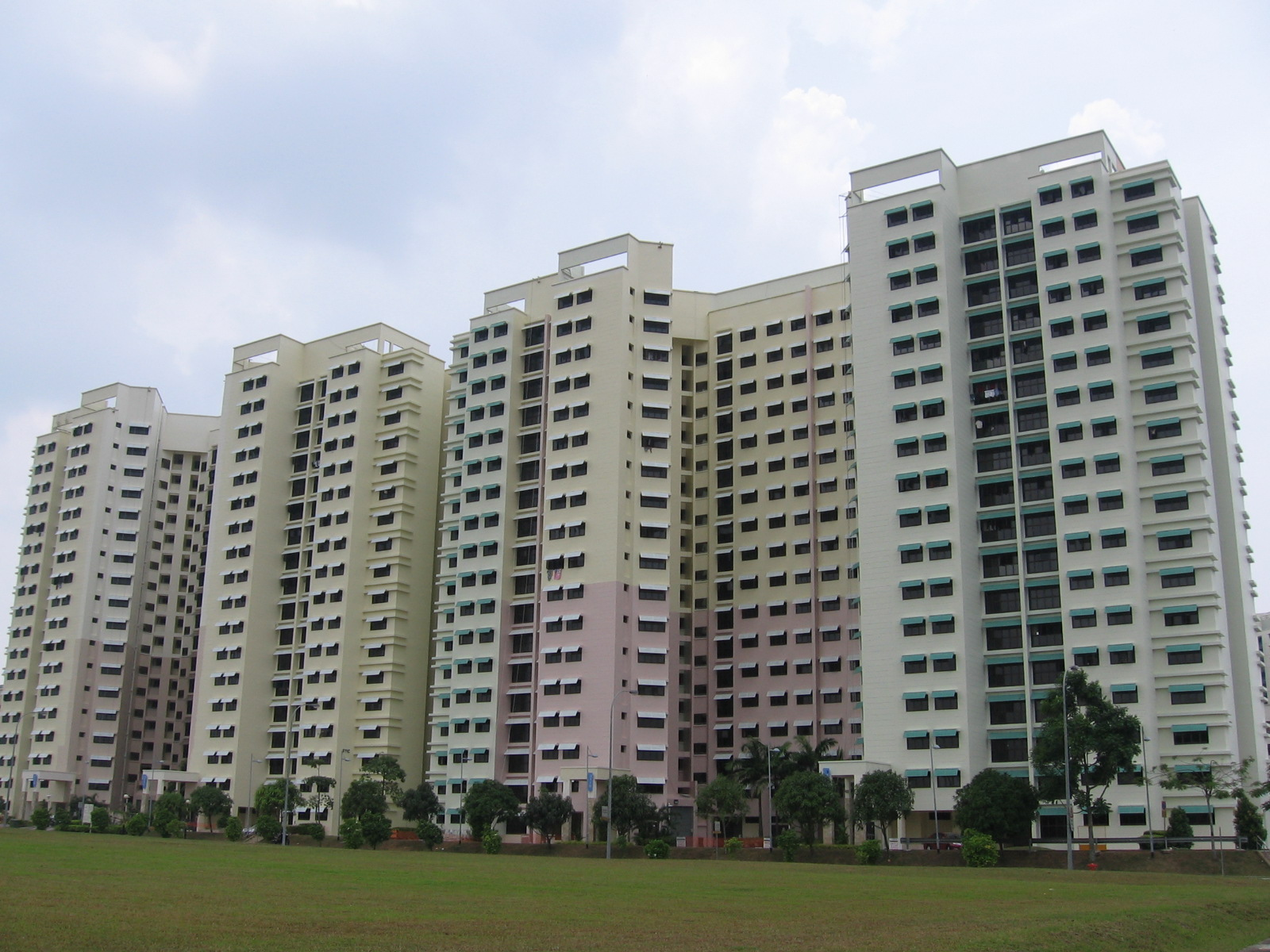
Anchorvale Vista

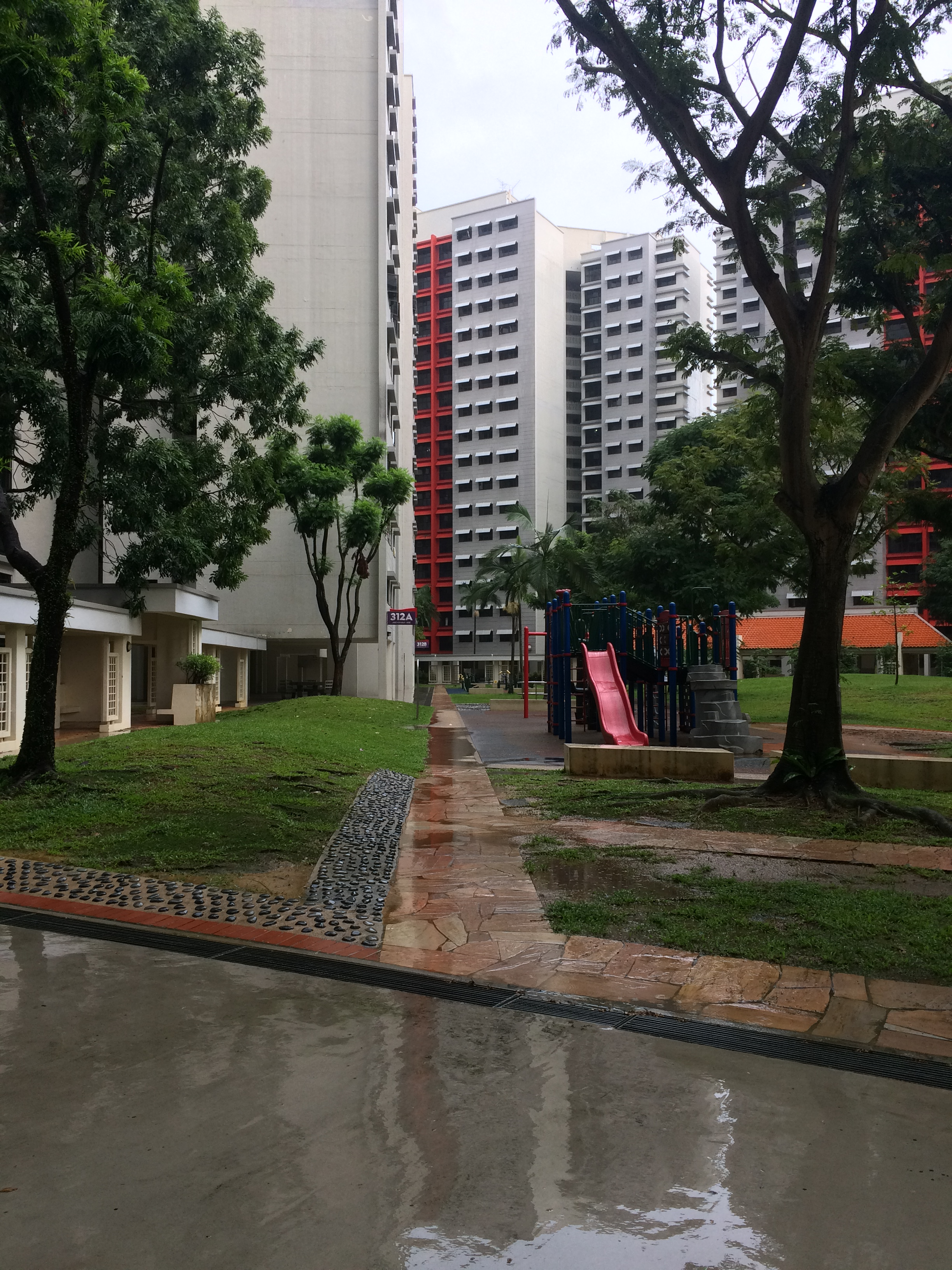
Anchorvale Vista (repainted)

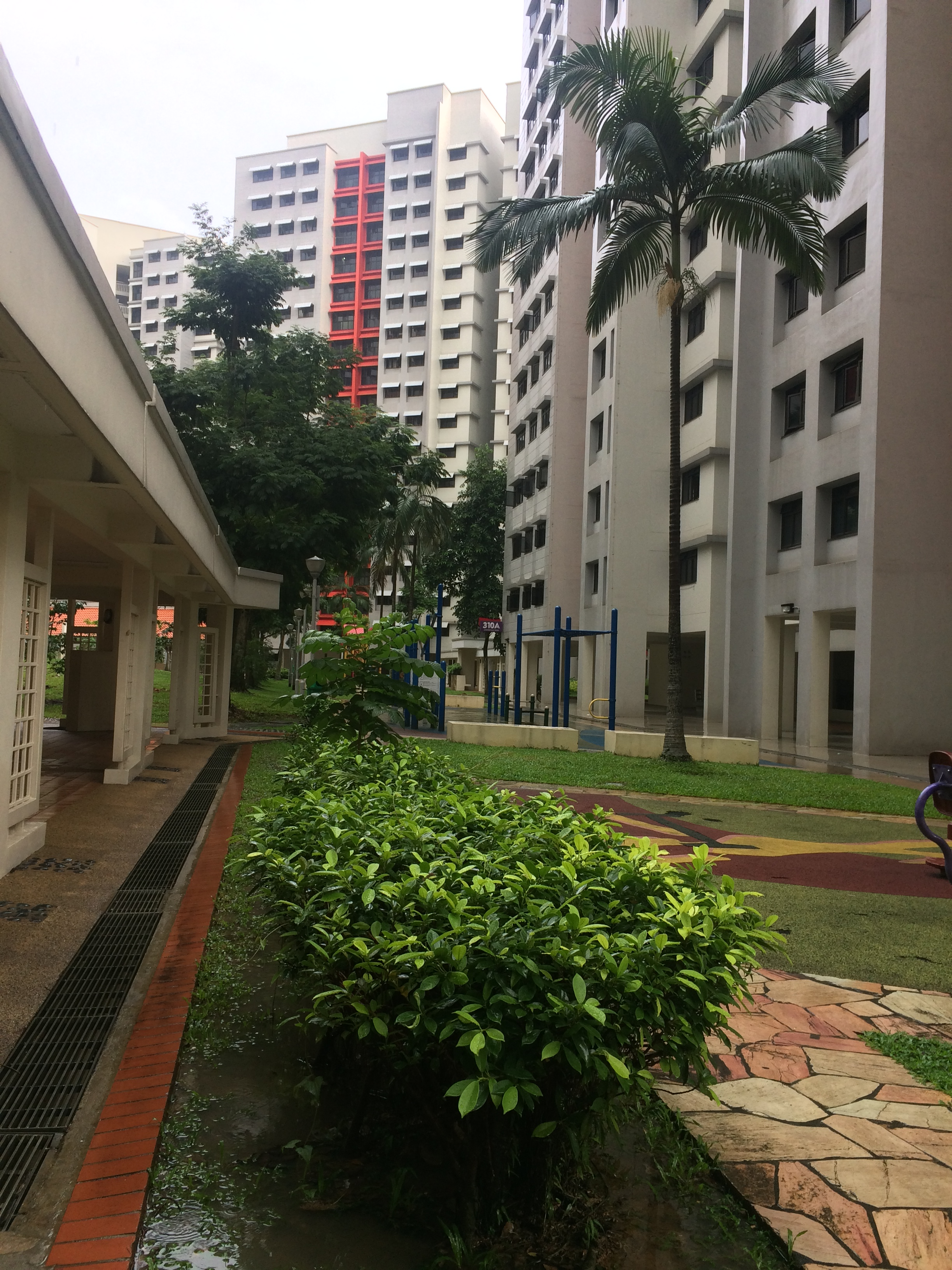

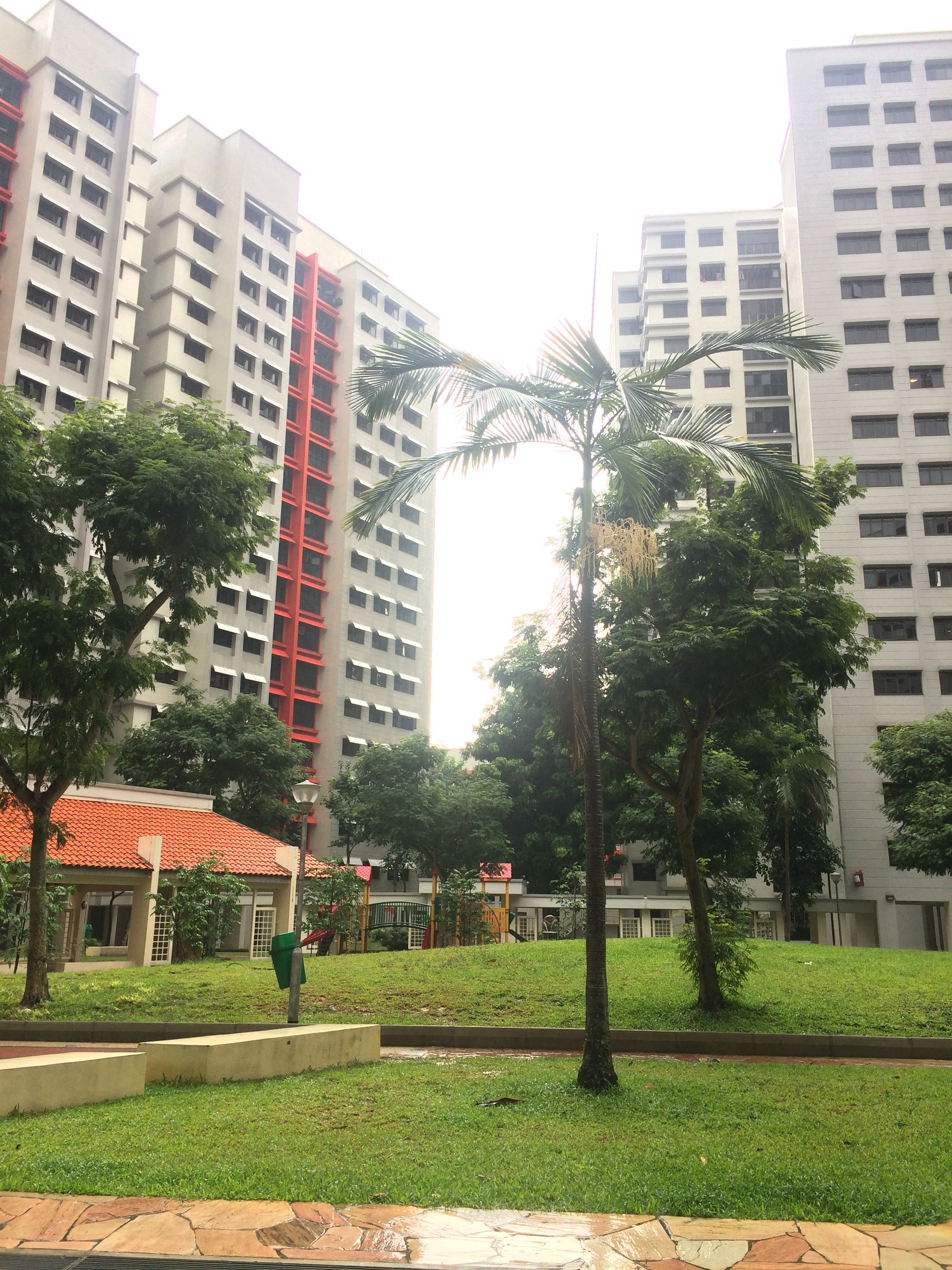
Anchorvale Vista

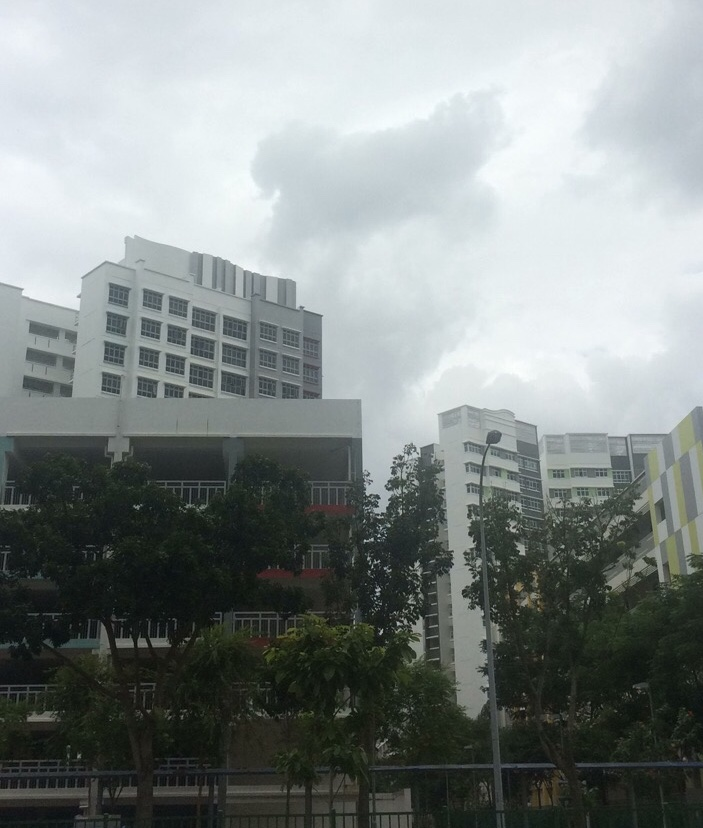
Anchorvale Horizons

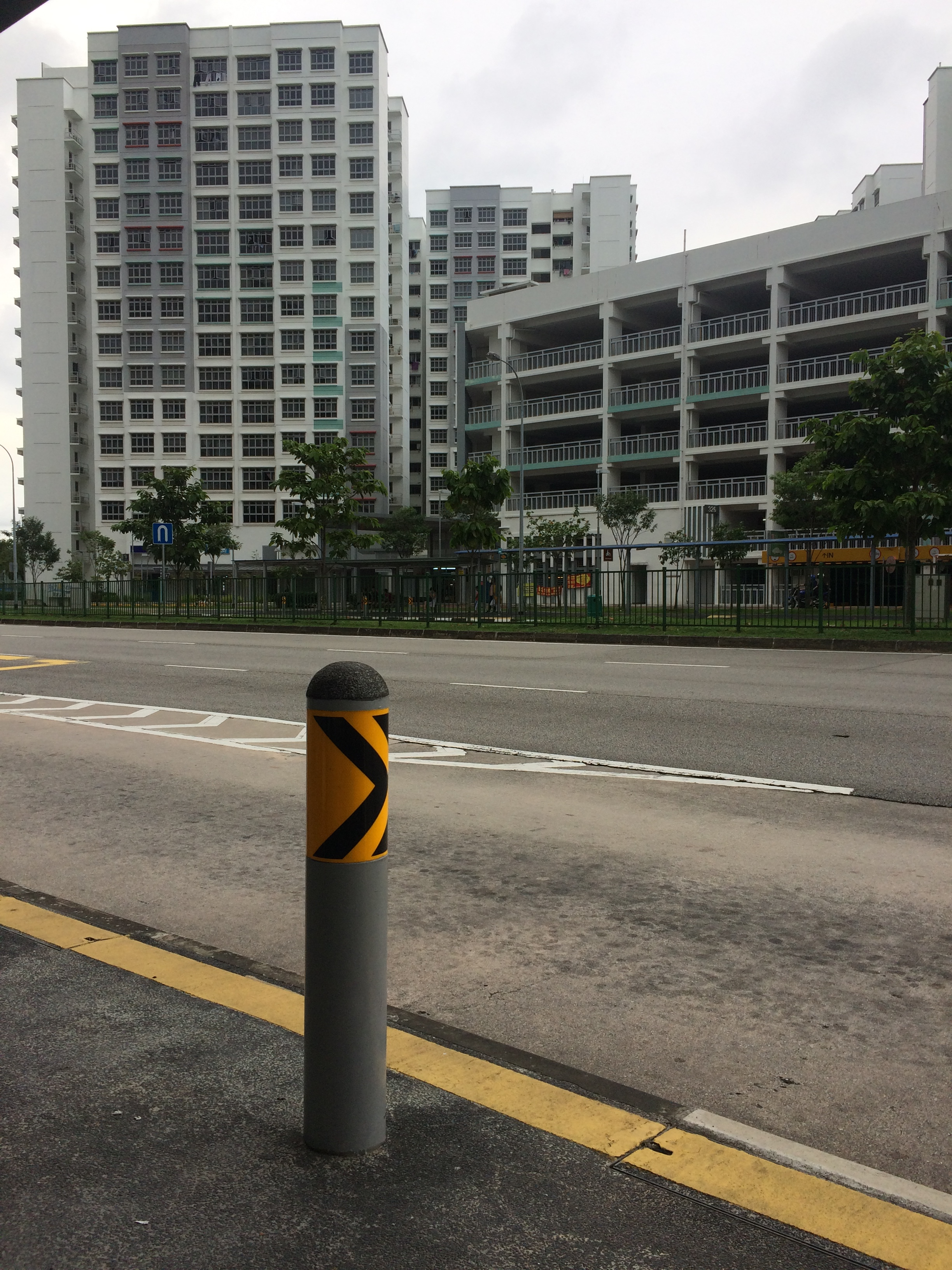
Anchorvale Horizons

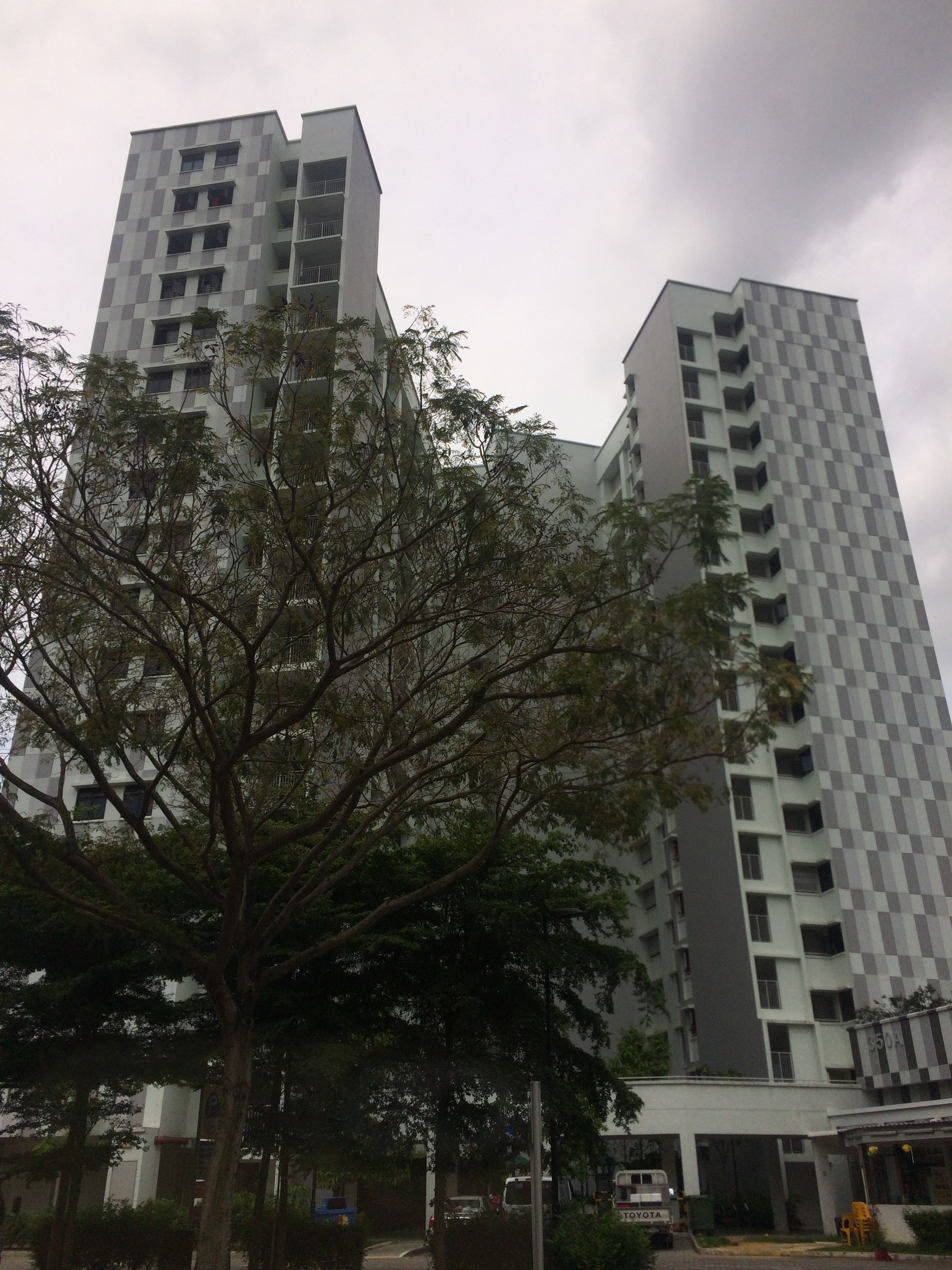
350 Anchorvale Road

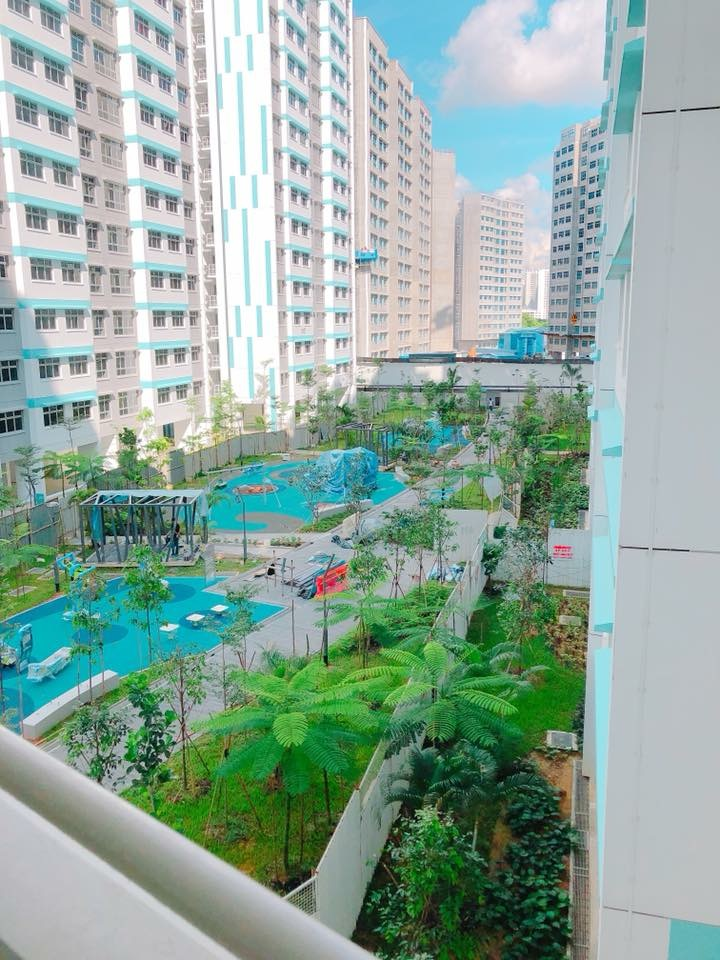
Anchorvale Fields

Educational institutions

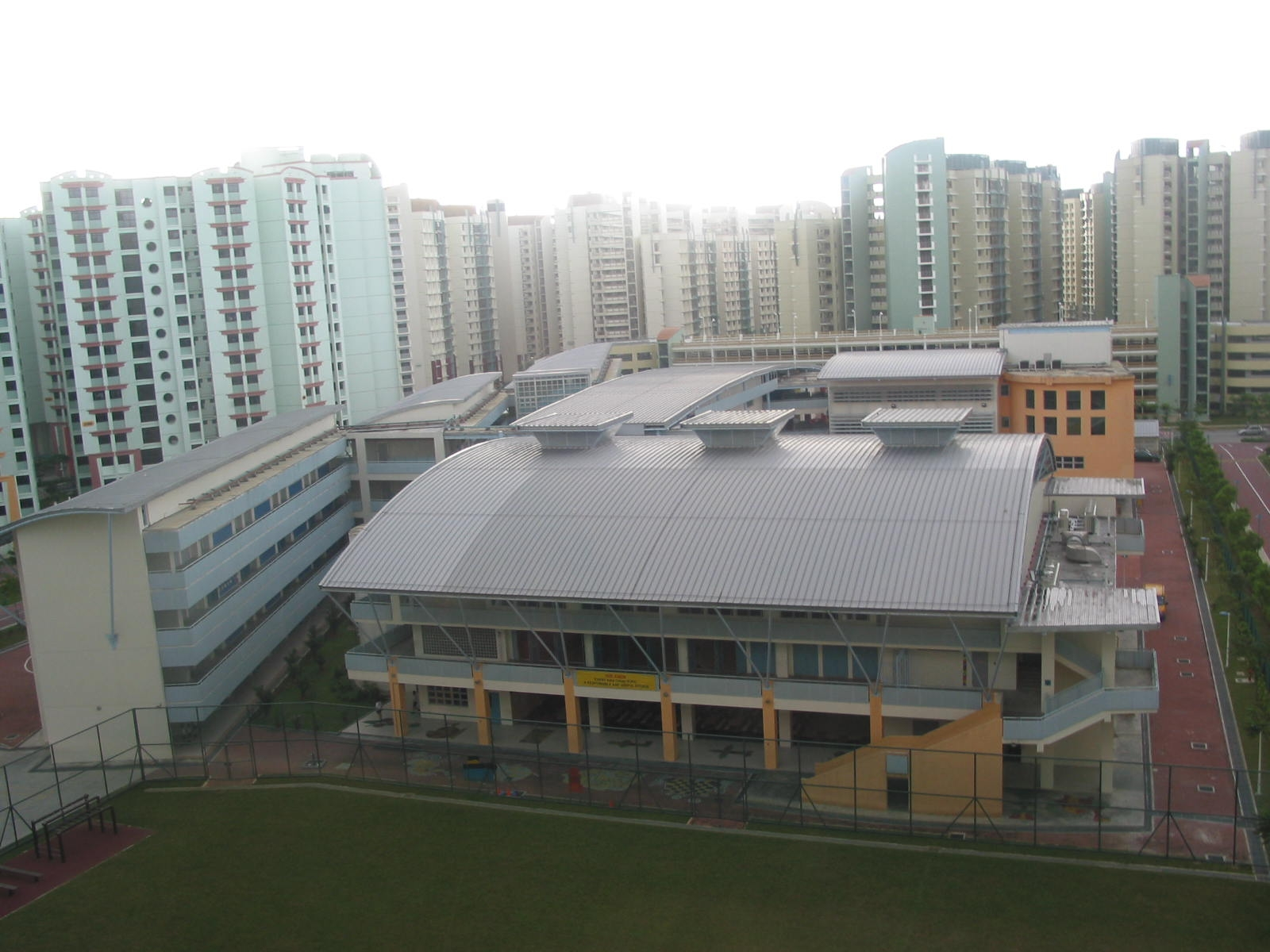
Nan Chiau Primary School

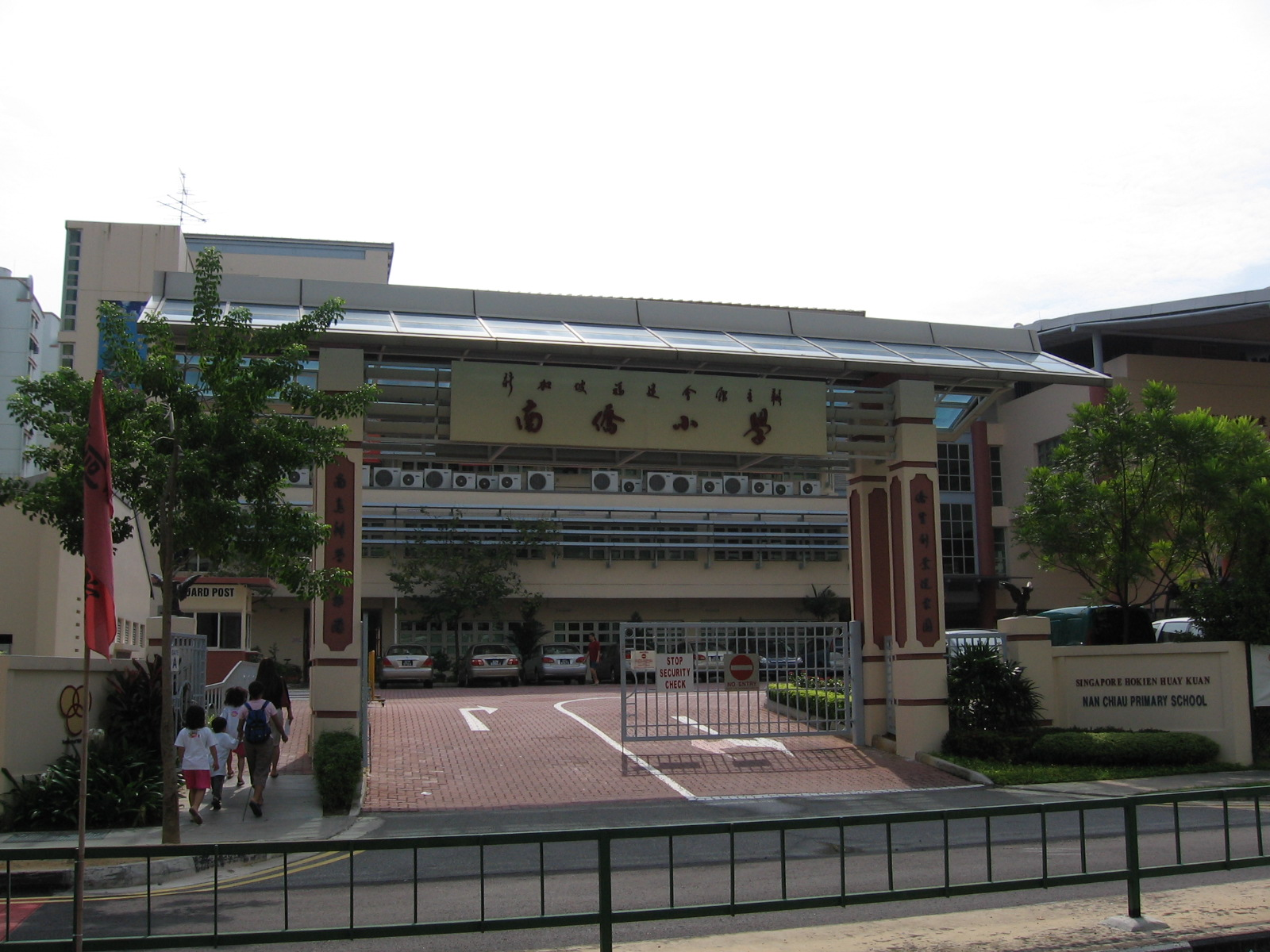
Nan Chiau Primary School

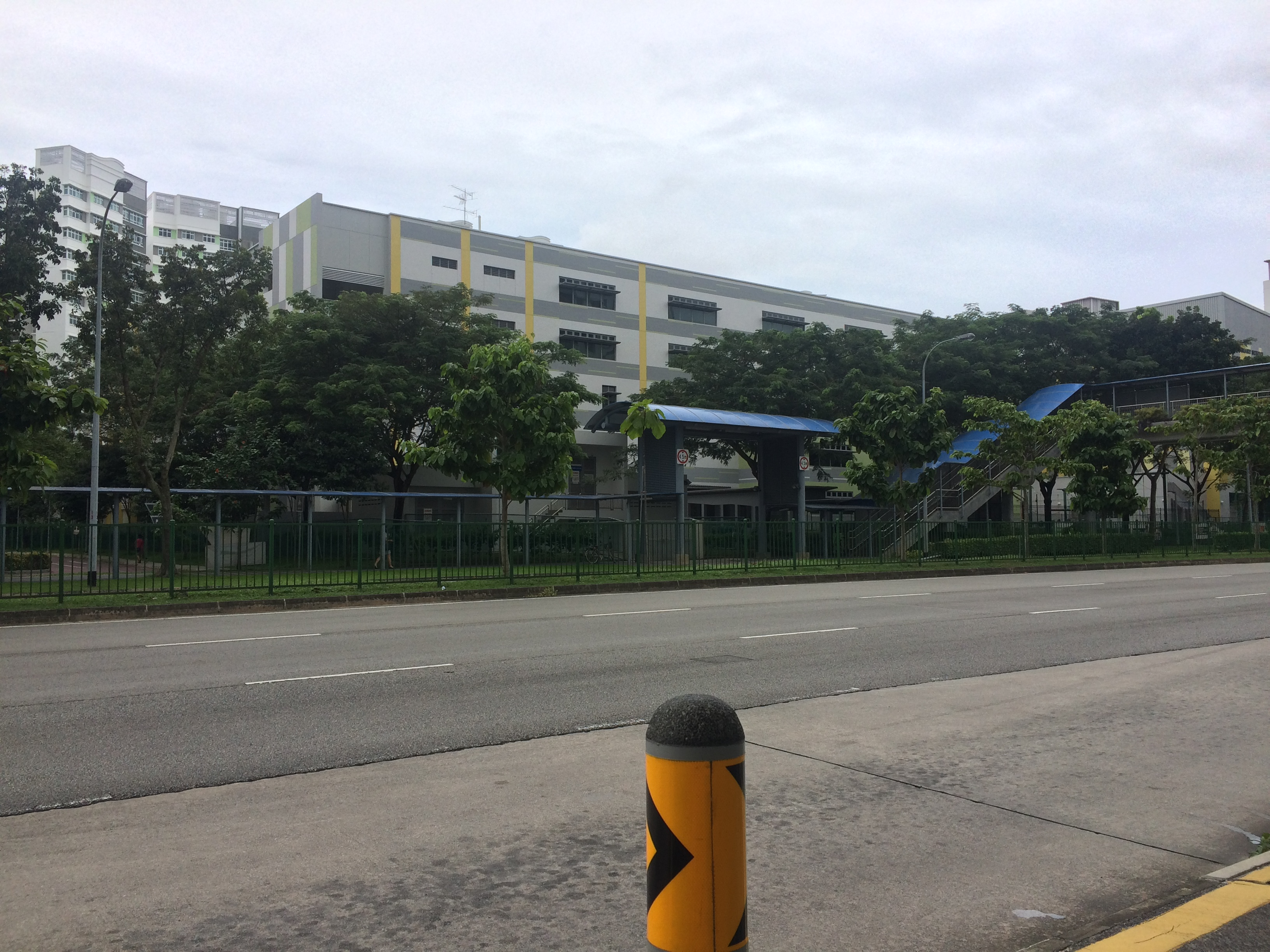
Springdale Primary School

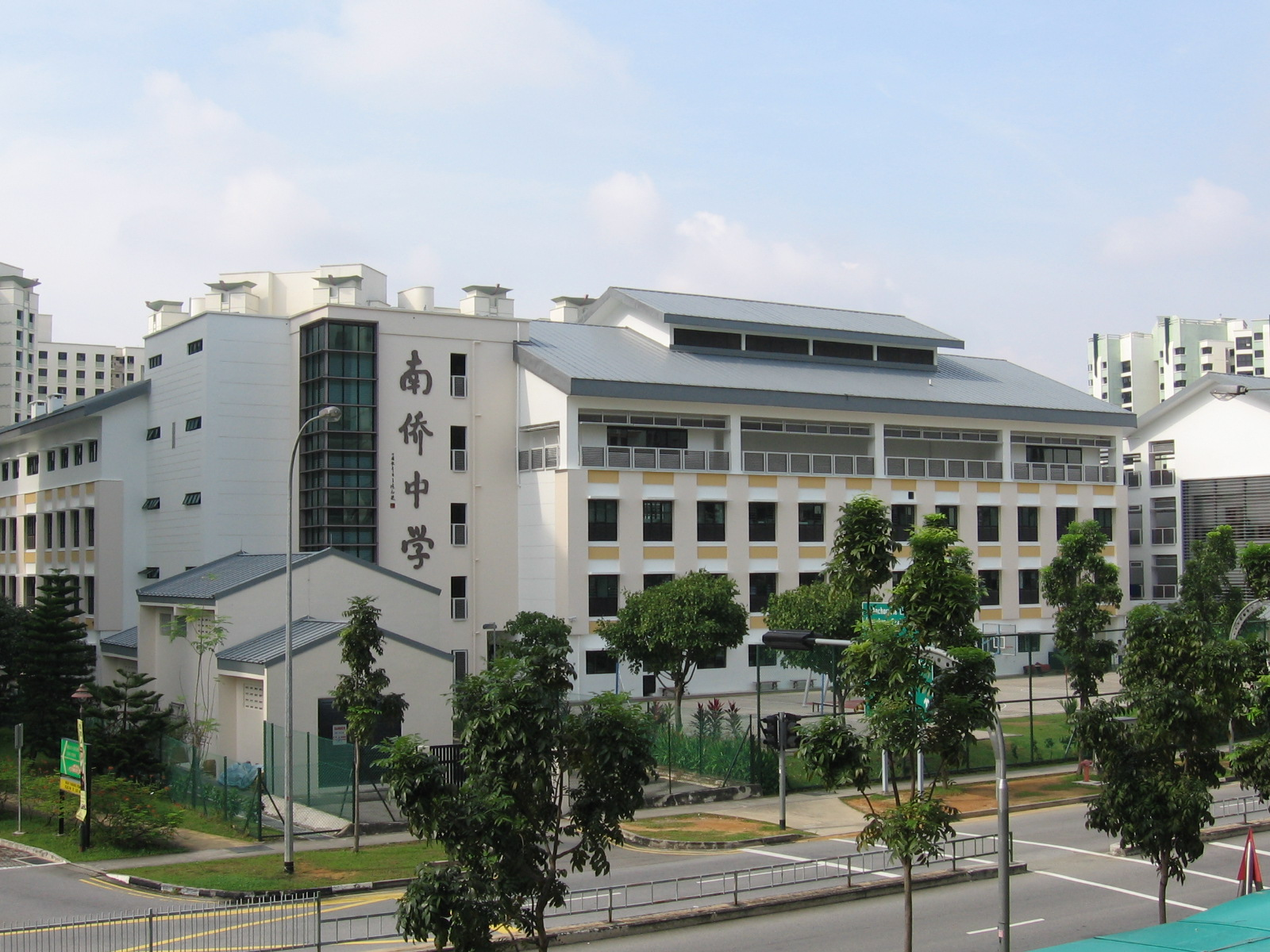
Nan Chiau High School

Places of worship

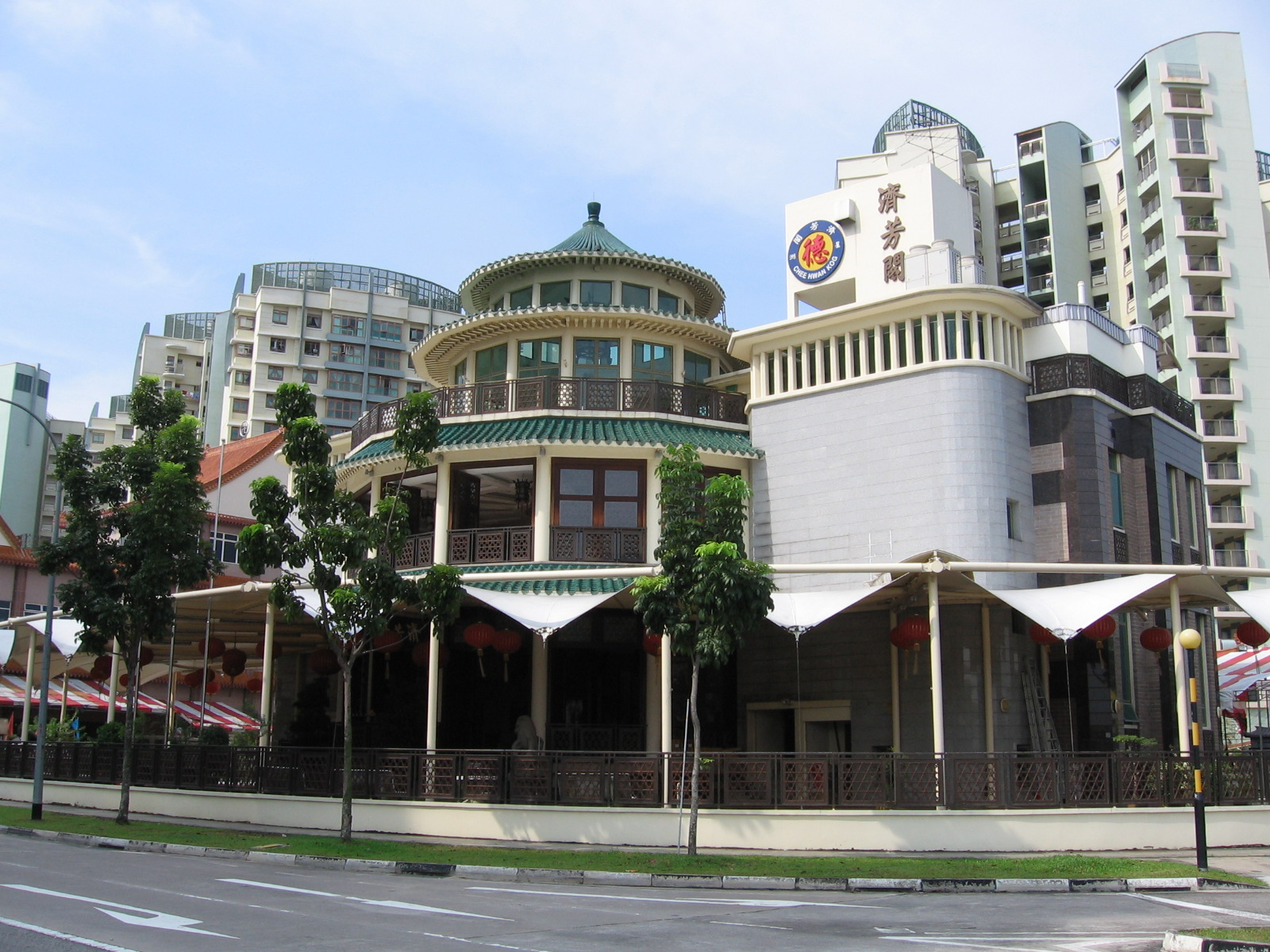
Chee Hwan Kog Temple

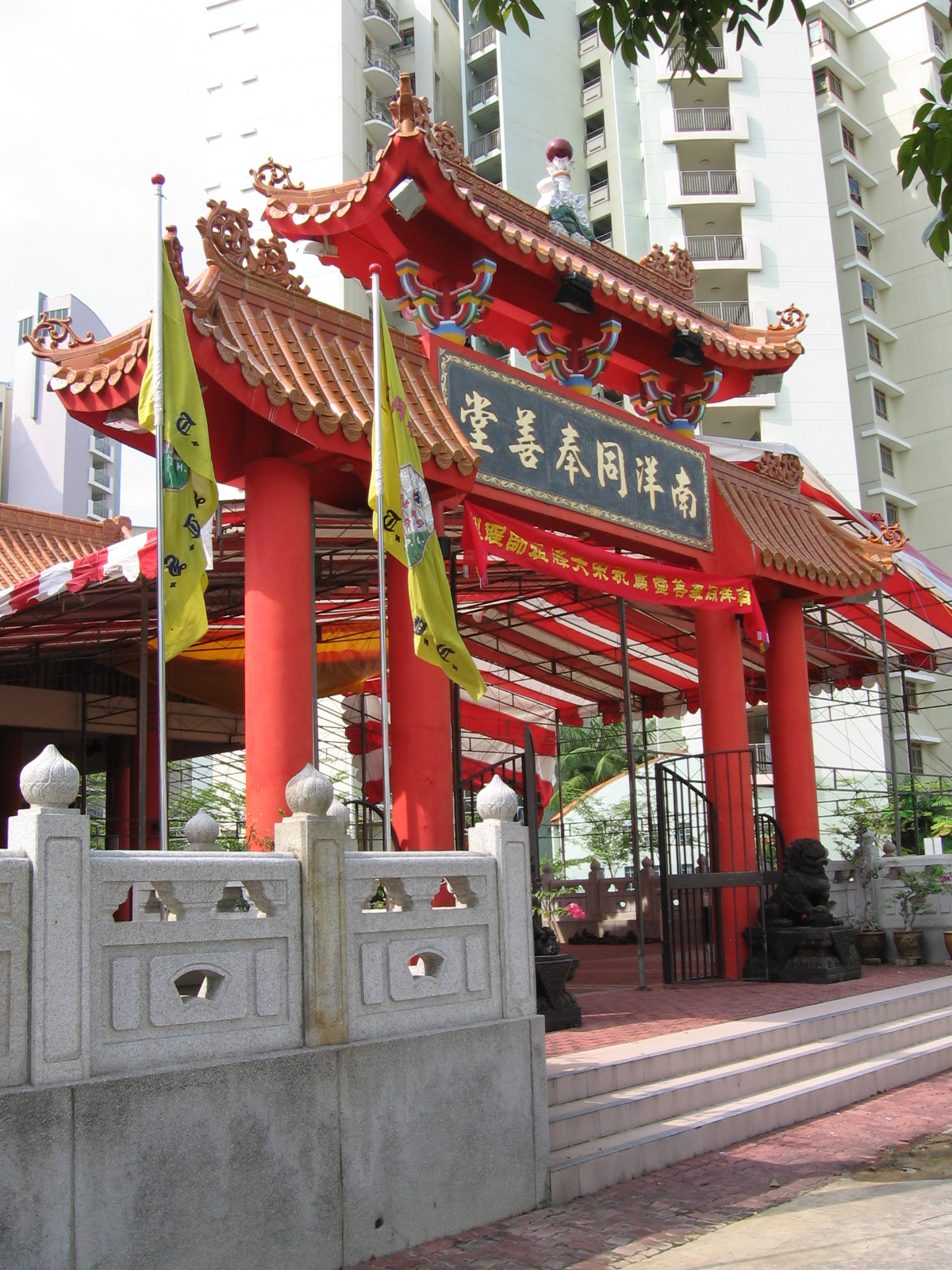
Nanyang Thong Hong Siang Tng Temple

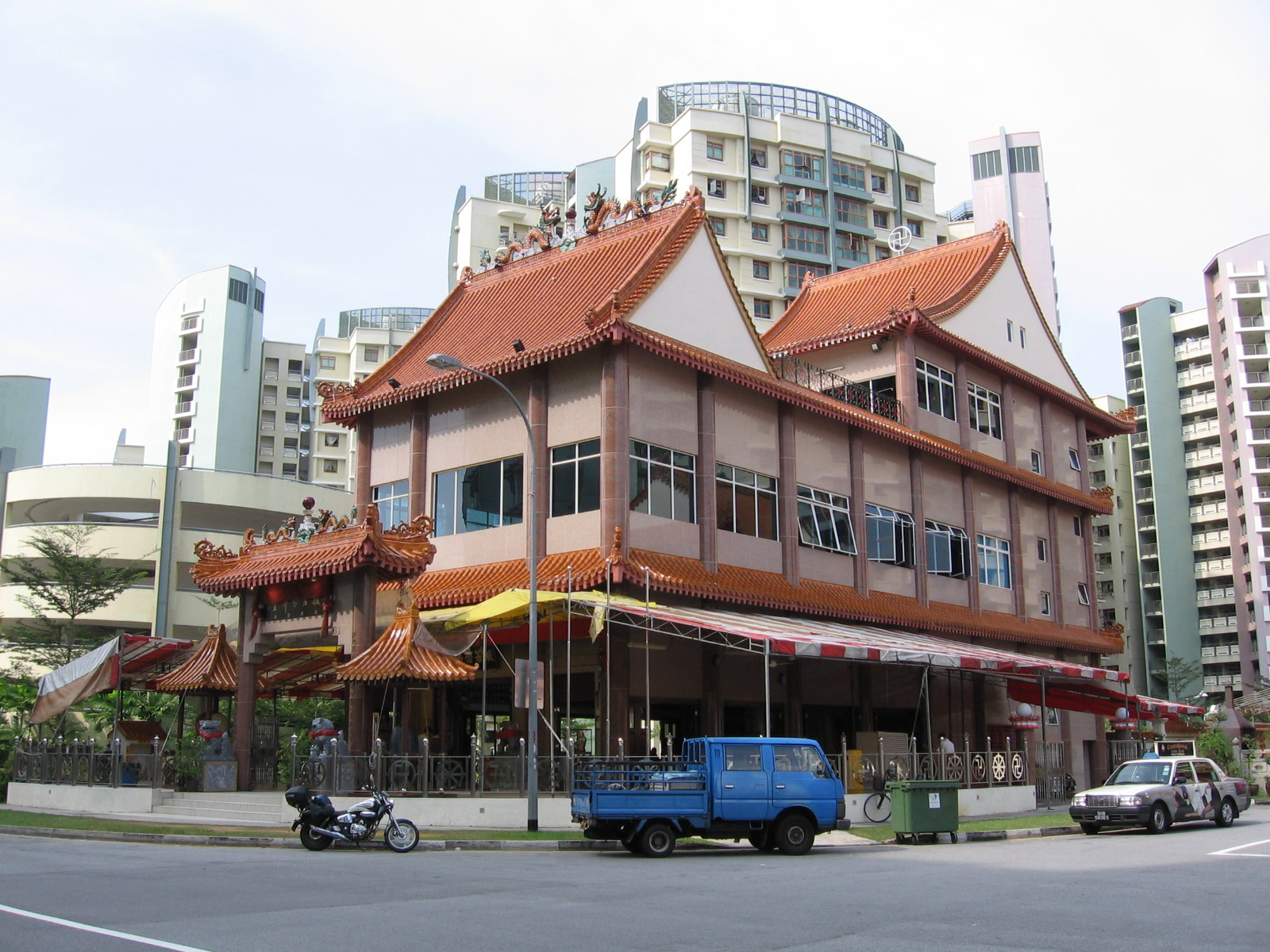
Puat Jit Buddhist Temple

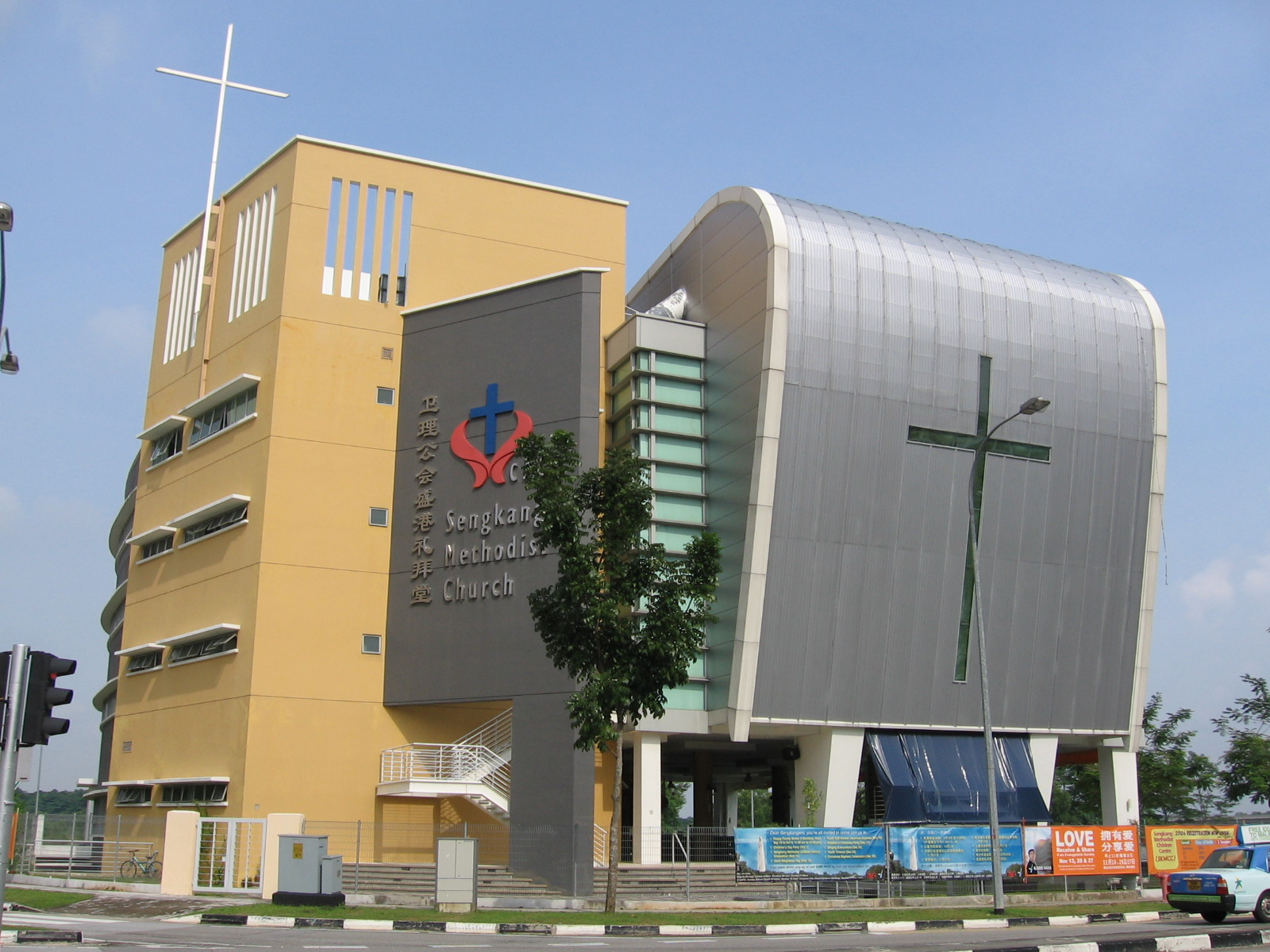
Sengkang Methodist Church

Other amenities

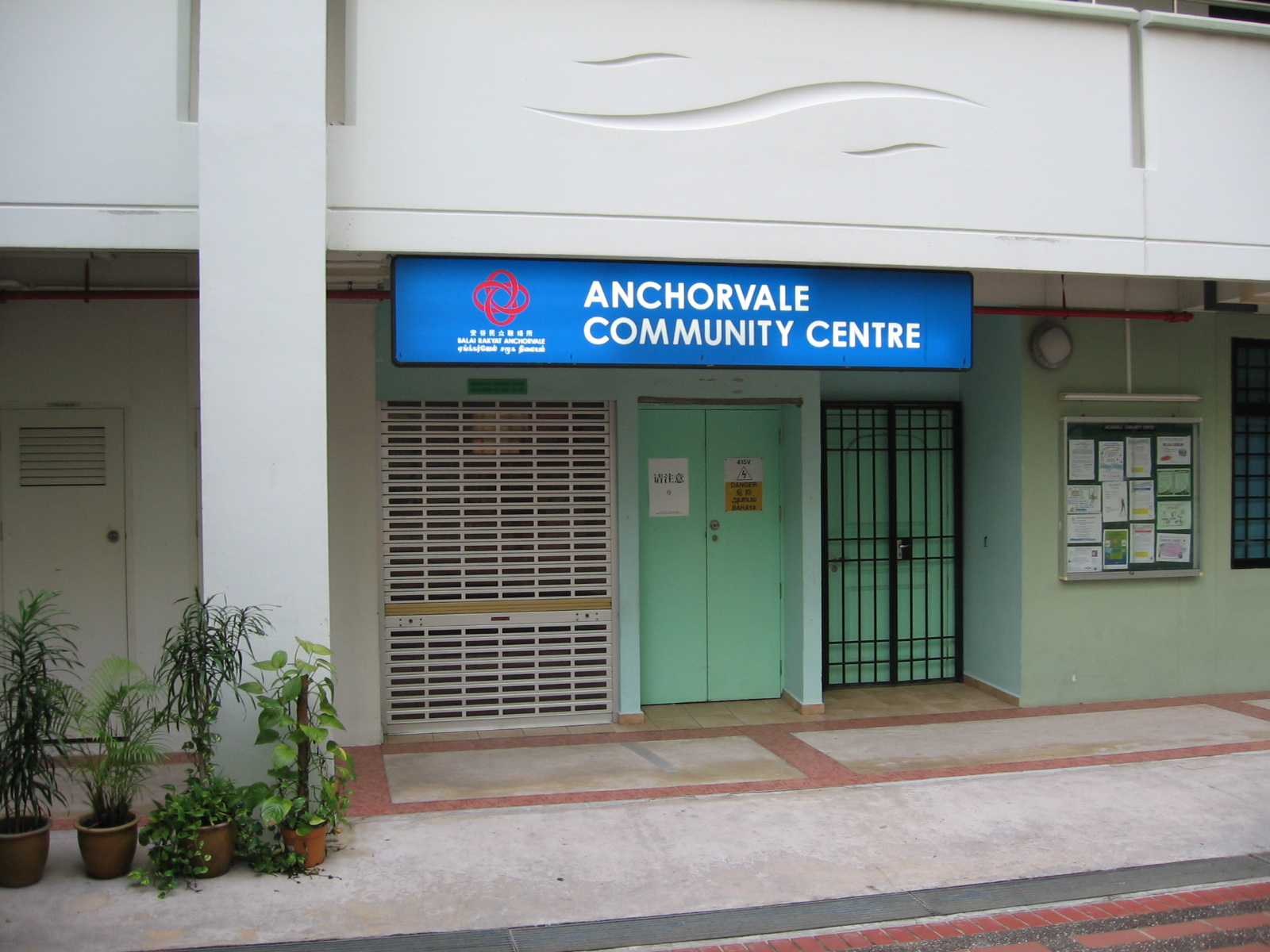
Anchorvale Community Centre
