= Sengkang Sports Centre =

Sports complex in Singapore

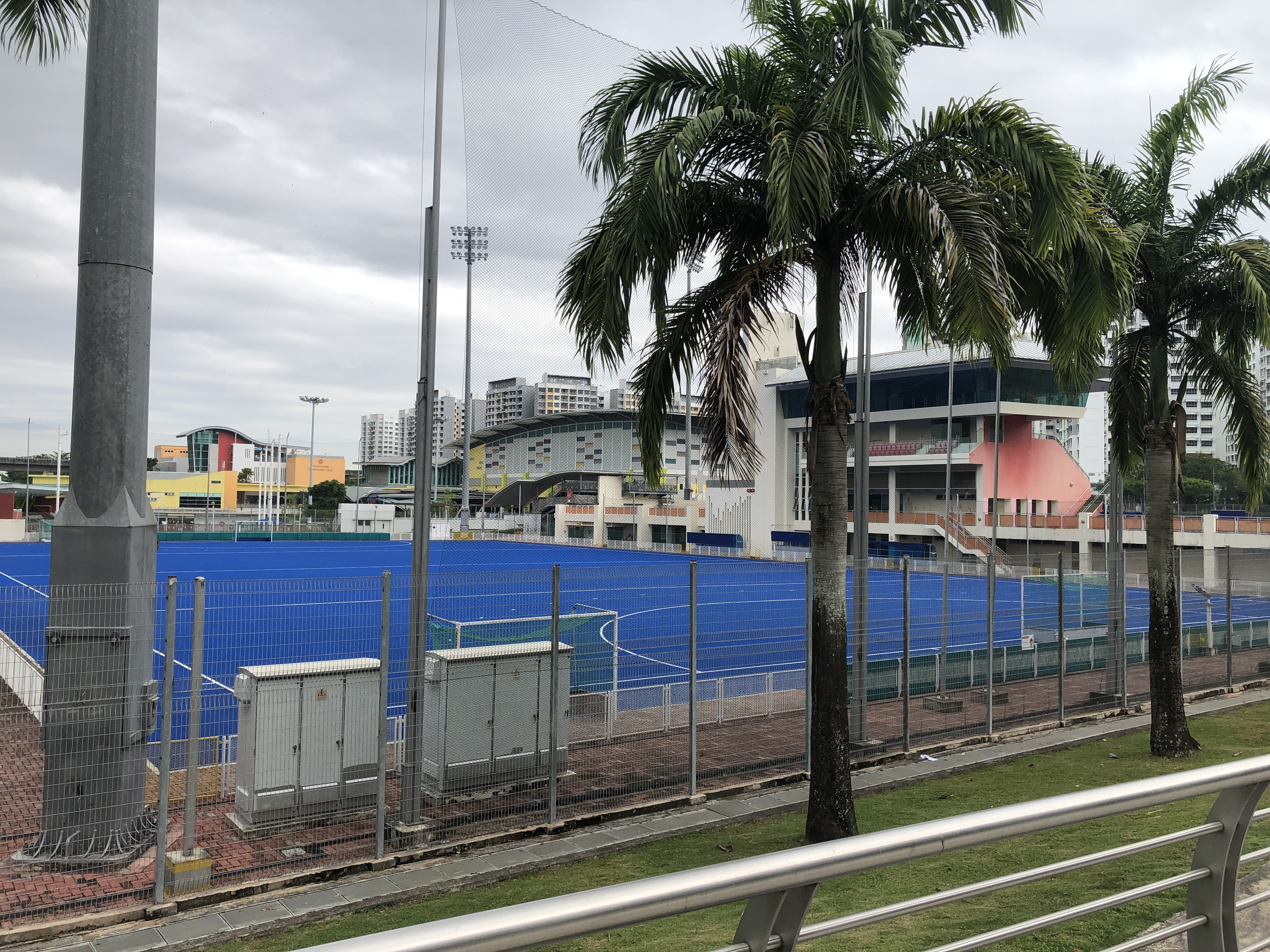
- Hockey field of Sengkang Sports Centre
- Interactive map of Sengkang Sports Centre
- Location: 57 Anchorvale Road, Singapore 544964
- Coordinates: 1°23′45″N 103°53′13″E
- Owner: People's Association, Sport Singapore
- Operator: People's Association, Sport Singapore
- Capacity: 200 (indoor arena)

Construction
- Groundbreaking: 2 April 2006; 20 years ago
- Opened: 1 August 2008; 18 years ago
- Cost: S$48.7 million
- Architects: LT & T Architects

Sengkang Sports Centre (Chinese: 盛港体育休闲中心; pinyin: Shènggǎng tǐyù xiūxián zhōngxīn; Malay: Pusat Sukan dan Rekreasi Sengkang; Tamil: விளையாட்டு மற்றும் பொழுதுபோக்கு மையம்), formerly known as Sengkang Sports and Recreation Centre, is a sports complex in Anchorvale of Sengkang New Town, Singapore, near Farmway LRT station. It was scheduled to open in end 2007, but its inauguration was delayed until mid-late 2008.

== History ==
Sengkang Sports Centre was built as part of a plan to improve amenities in Pasir Ris-Punggol Group Representation Constituency and Sengkang New Town, costing S$1 billion. The People's Association and the then Singapore Sports Council were involved in the planning of the sports complex, and went ahead with the project despite Singapore's economic recession in the early 2000s. Fund raising campaigns were initiated by grassroots leaders to support the construction of the complex.

Although the sports complex was originally planned to be ready by 2004, construction began only in 2006. On 2 April that year, the groundbreaking ceremony for Sengkang Sports Centre was held, attended by Member of Parliament for Ang Mo Kio Group Representation Constituency Wee Siew Kim. The S$48.7 million complex was designed by architectural firm LT & T Architects, and was completed by the end of 2007.

== Facilities ==
Situated on 4 hectares of land beside Sungei Punggol, Sengkang Sports Centre houses a community club, and feature sports facilities including four swimming pools and five water slides. One of the slides has four colours similar to the slides at East Coast Park, which is now closed. It also has an indoor sports hall and a synthetic soccer field and hockey pitch currently used for training by the National Singapore Hockey Team as well as Sengkang Secondary School, the pitch comes up to 12,000 square metres (129,170 square feet).

The four-storey Anchorvale Community Club is the first community centre in Singapore to be built next to a river and co-located with a sports complex. The available facilities include a multi-media room, a tea arts room, playrooms, a large multi-purpose hall, a reading and study area, and a roof terrace. There is also space for retail, a riverfront café and eating outlets.

The indoor sports hall accommodates 12 badminton courts and can also be used for basketball and volleyball. Retractable seating, which allows flexible use of the hall, can seat 200 spectators. Other indoor facilities include a dance studio and a gymnasium, which is in the indoor sport hall with the badminton courts.

The sports centre also includes a two-pitch hockey stadium, which was used as a competition venue for hockey during the 2010 Summer Youth Olympics.

The sports complex is linked to Sengkang Floating Wetland on Sungei Punggol. People can take part in water sports and other activities. A park connector, a continuous landscaped pavement for pedestrians and cyclists, runs beside the riverbank, connecting all the facilities. Anchorvale Community Club has adopted the Sungei Punggol under the Ministry of the Environment and Water Resources' and Public Utilities Board's Active, Beautiful and Clean (ABC) Waters Programme, and takes the lead in protecting the natural environment of the river.

The public swimming pools in Sengkang Sports Centre started operation from 1 August 2008. Located at 57 Anchorvale Road, Singapore 544964, Sengkang Swimming Complex, it is within walking distance from Farmway LRT station. It is closed for maintenance on Mondays. It has 3 levels of slides: the Speed Slide and Tunnel Slide while on the second level the Multi Coloured slides with a capacity of 4 riders at a time. Lastly, on level 3 there are the twister slides with a capacity of 2 riders at a time.

== See also ==
- List of stadiums in Singapore
