= Sungei Punggol =

River in northeast Singapore

Coordinates: 1°25′04″N 103°53′54″E

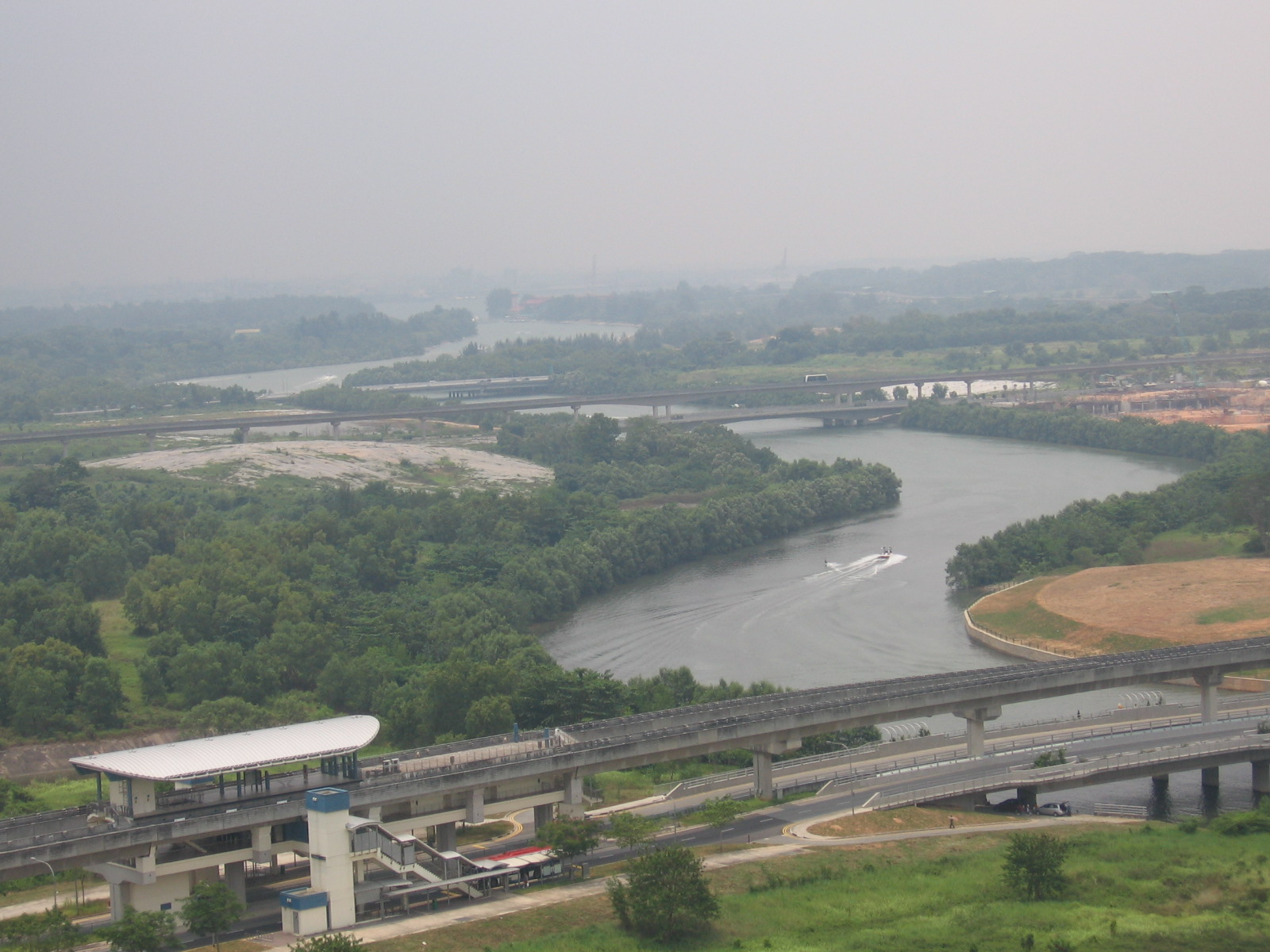
Sungei Punggol flowing towards its mouth at the Straits of Johor.

Sungei Punggol (Malay for Punggol River; Chinese: 榜鵝河; Pinyin: Bǎng'é Hé) is a river located within the North-East Region in Singapore.

== Geography ==
Other than Punggol New Town, the river flows through 7 other towns in the late 1990s and early 2000s, much of the river banks along Sungei Punggol have since been reclaimed and the river canalised. Since 2011, it is now part of the Punggol Reservoir. In addition, Kampong Tongkang Pecah was along Sungei Punggol as well.

== Developments ==
To better serve the recreational needs of the residents of Sengkang New Town, a network of green connectors have been built along the banks of Sungei Punggol. These connectors link the housing precincts to neighbourhood parks, the town park and Sengkang Sports Centre in the new town. These park connectors are also linked to the Coney Island Park in Punggol New Town and Punggol Park in Hougang.

An artificial floating island has been constructed in the middle of the river in the Sengkang part of the river.

The Sengkang Riverside Park, which opened in November 2008, is situated beside the Sungei Punggol.

The estuary of Sungei Punggol has also been dammed to form a reservoir, in 2011 with Sungei Serangoon.

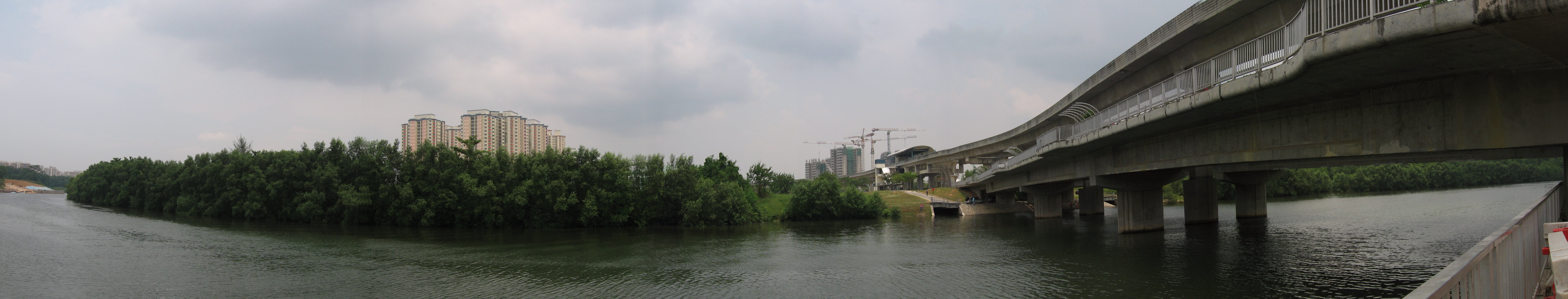
Panoramic view of the remaining mangrove vegetation along the banks of Sungei Punggol, towards Fernvale in Sengkang New Town.
